= Caves in Somaliland =

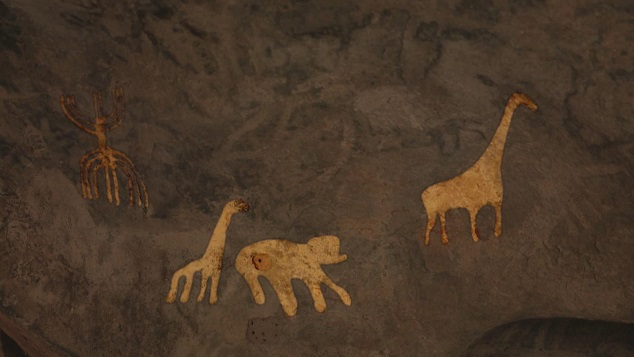
Wild animals depicted in the caves of Dhaymoole, Somaliland, many of whom have gone extinct in the region.

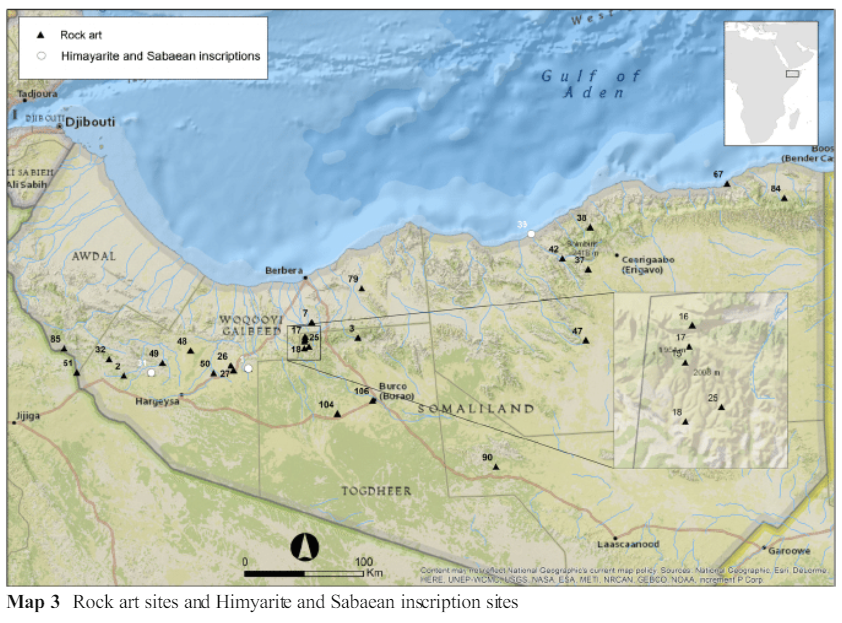
Map of Somaliland showing represents rock art sites and Himyarite and Sabaean.

Somaliland has many caves, some of which remain undiscovered. Such is the quality of the paintings that at least 10 sites, scattered across semi-desert terrain, are likely to be given World Heritage status.

The complex cave and rock shelters of Laas Geel, Dhagah Kureh, and Dhagah Nabi Galay lie just 30-45 minutes outside of Hargeisa, the capital of Somaliland, a self-declared republic. Exhibiting outstanding Neolithic rock art, the sites’ cave paints are considered to be some of the best preserved rock paintings in all of Africa, and are essential to the Horn of Africa’s historical and heritage legacy.

== With rock art ==
=== Laas Geel ===
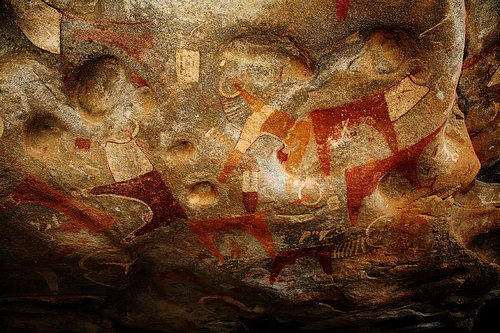
Neolithic rock art at the Laas Geel.

Laas Geel(Somali: Laas Geel), also spelled Laas Gaal, are cave formations on the rural outskirts of Hargeisa, Somaliland. They contain some of the earliest known cave paintings in the Horn of Africa. Laas Geel's rock art is estimated to date to somewhere between 9,000 and 3,000 years BC.

=== Dhagah Nabi Galay ===
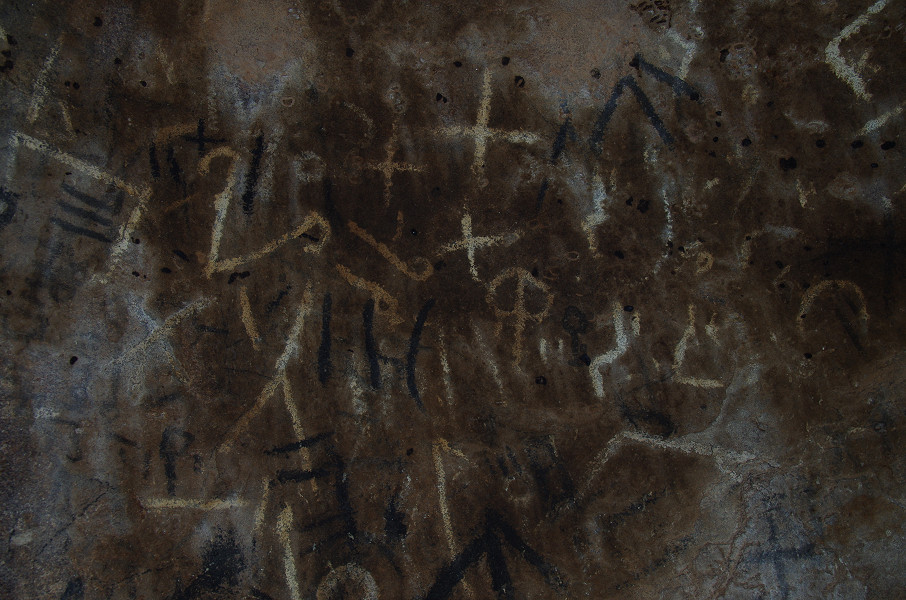
Neolithic rock art at the Dhagah Nabi Galay .

One of the sites associated with Laas Geel, Dhagah Nabi Galay is unique in that it features what is considered to be the first examples of writing in East Africa. There has been minimal research conducted on this site, but it offers a wonderful opportunity to study the Neolithic Horn of Africa anterior to the introduction of Islam.The rock art features a script or writing system believed to have been developed by a Neolithic civilization in northern Somalia. Ancient inscriptions and writing systems have been found throughout northern Somalia, particularly at sites like Laas Geel and other rock art locations.

=== Dhagah Kureh ===
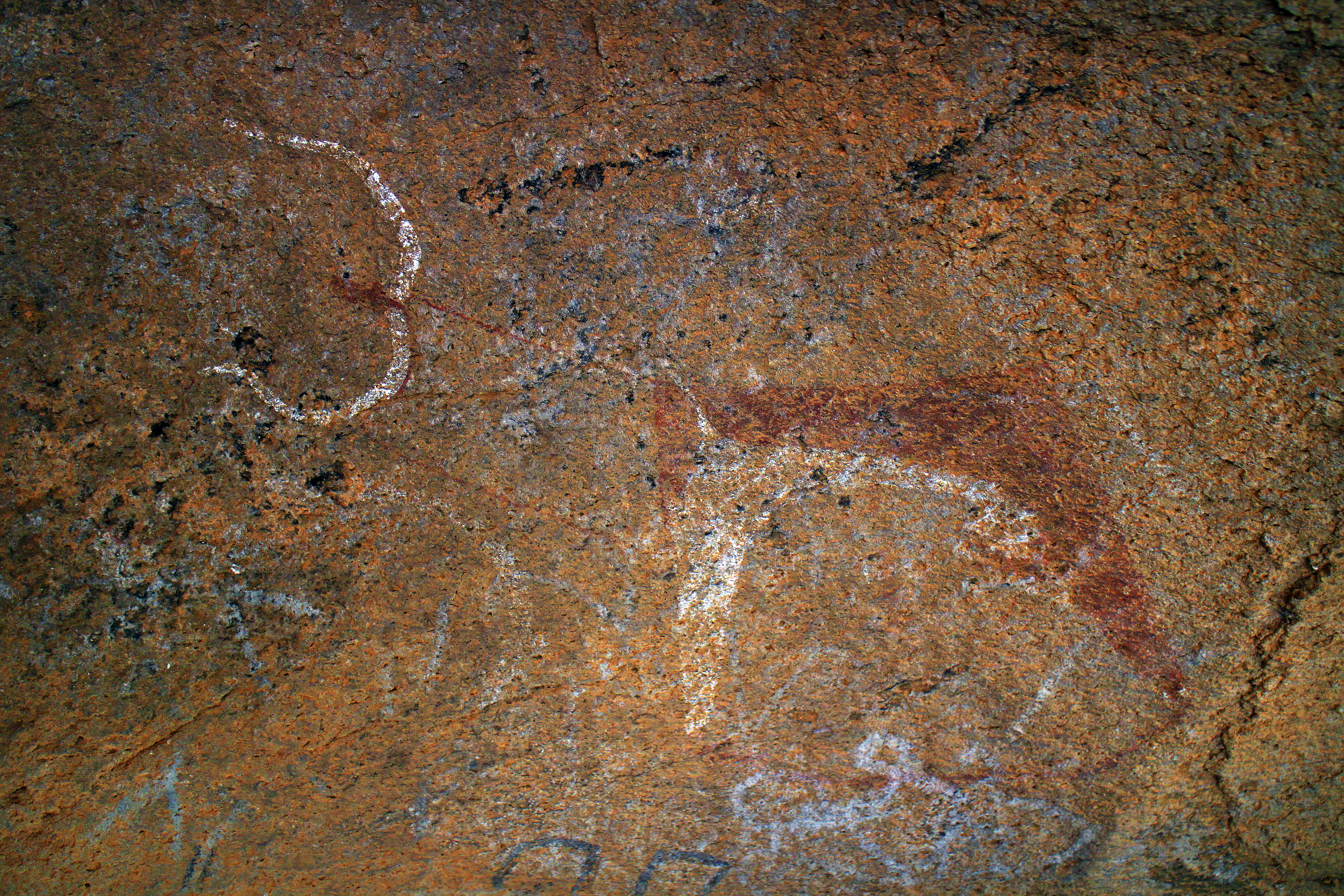
Dhagah Kureh exhibits the most rock paintings depicting cows in Somaliland,.

Dhagah Kureh translates to “the stone with the head” in the Somali language. The site is located in a beautiful and naturally green landscape with fertile farming lands nearby, and the rock shelters are made of stony outcrops with rocks resting on each other above an approximately 4 km-long granite range. The greatest number of rock art panels depicting large cows in Somaliland is found in Shelter 1 of Dhagah Kureh, making this site unique amongst the rock art sites of Somaliland.

=== Dhambalin ===
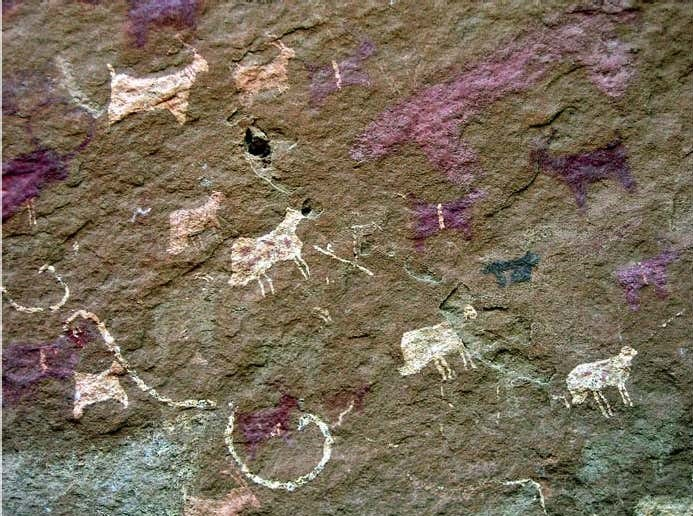
Snakes, sheep and goat polychrome with symbolic elements in Dhambalin.

Dhambalin ("half, vertically cut mountain") is an archaeological site in the northwestern Sahil province of Somaliland. The sandstone rock shelter, contains rock art depicting various animals, such as horned cattle and goats, as well as giraffes, an animal no longer found in Somaliland region. The site also features the earliest known pictures of sheep in Somaliland. Discovered in autumn 2007, residents of Beenyo Dhaadheer reported the rock art to the Somali archaeologist Sada Mire, Director of the Department of Archaeology within the Ministry of Tourism and Culture of Somaliland.

=== Dhaymoole ===
Dhaymoole is an archaeological site in the Sahil province of Somaliland. The walls of the cave are full of infilled and outlined white camels, unidentified quadrupeds and symbols. Most of the quadrupeds are schematic and depicted upright facing right. Dhaymoole, Somaliland. Caves of Dhaymoole, believed to be about 3000 to 5000 years old.

=== Shimuhshimuh or Haadh ===
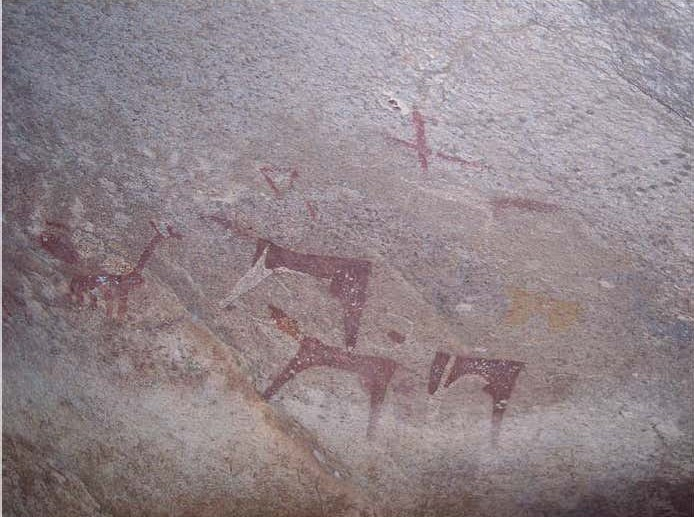
A herd of cows and Giraffe in Haadh, Sanaag.

Cave paintings have been found at Shimuhshimuh north of Erigavo. The painting were found by Jama Dabhaan and colleagues in 2010 but have been declared now after the photos taken were recovered. Other places at the Guban area north of Shimuhshimuh have also some of the oldest painting of animals in the Horn of Africa. The paintings of animals are the first to be found in Somaliland. Shimuhshimuh is a location close to Surad which is the highest mountain in Somaliland and Somalia.

== See also ==
- History of Somaliland
- Laas Geel
- Dhaymoole
- Dhambalin
