= Rock art =

Human-made markings on natural stone

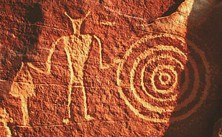
Fremont Petroglyph, in Dinosaur National Monument, attributed to Classic Vernal Style, Fremont archaeological culture, eastern Utah, United States

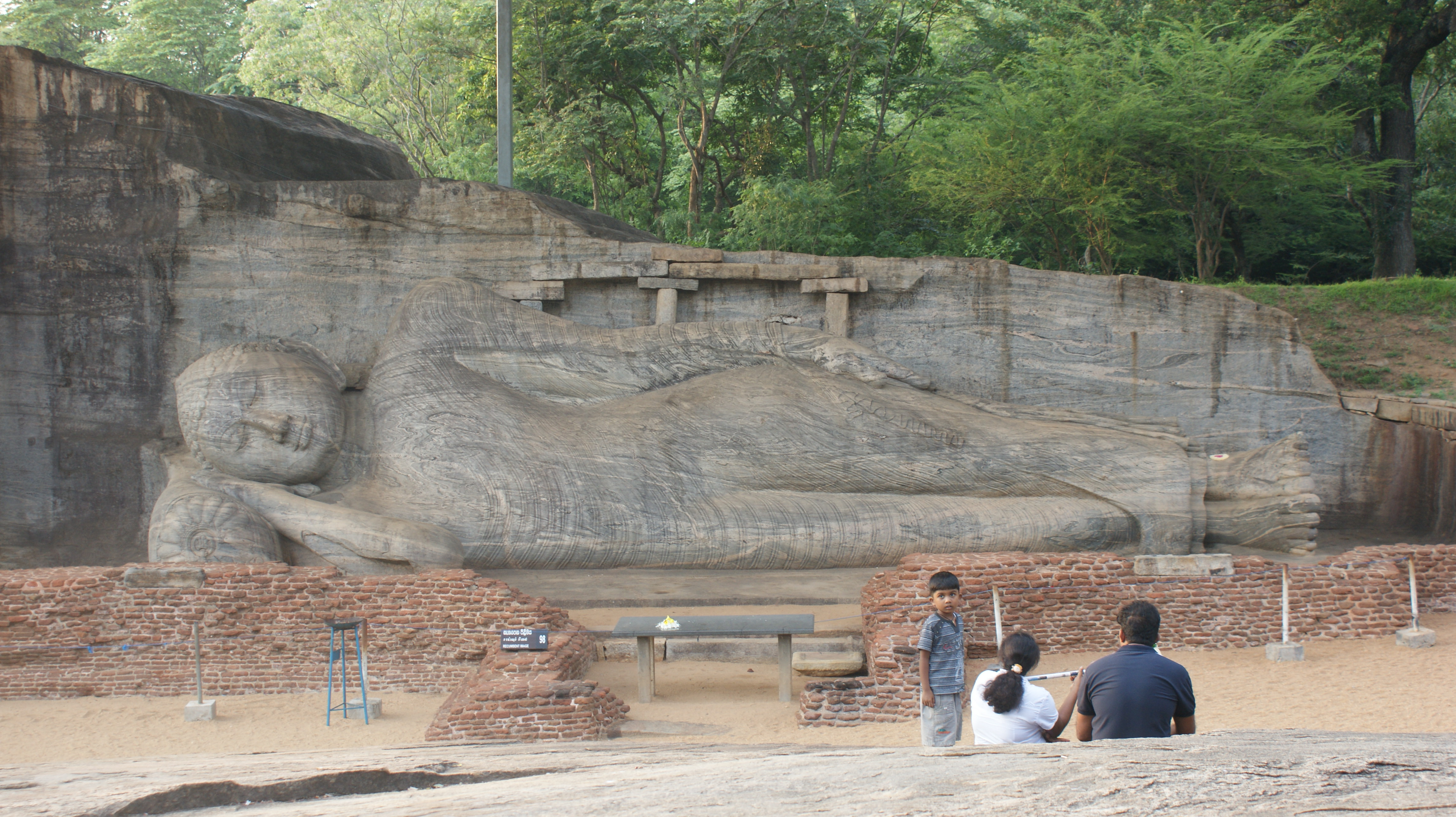
Reclining Buddha at Gal Vihara, Sri Lanka, where the remains of two columns to support the structure that originally enclosed it are visible

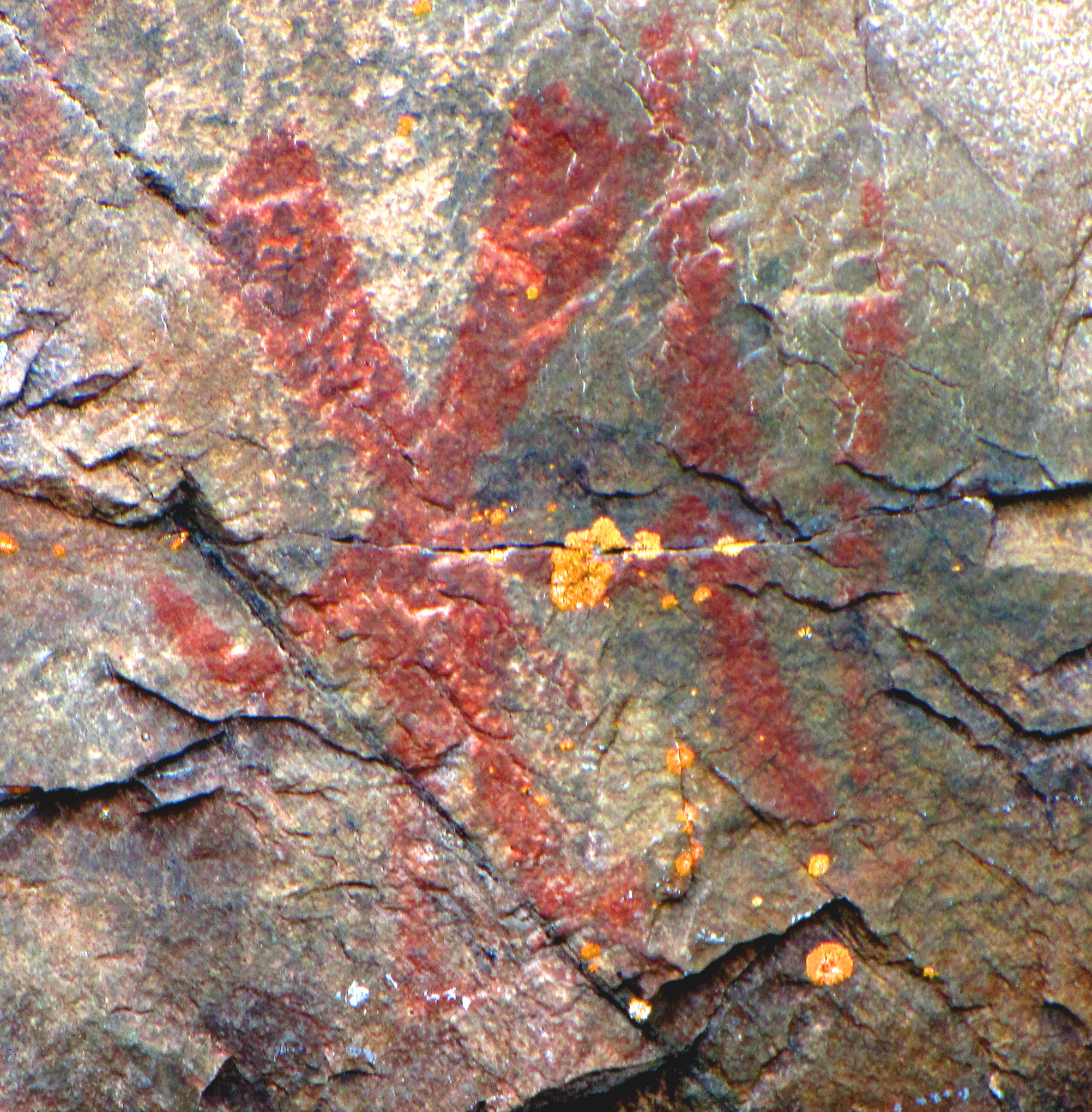
Nanabozho pictograph, Mazinaw Rock, Bon Echo Provincial Park, Ontario, Canada

In archaeology, rock art refers to human-made markings placed on natural surfaces, typically vertical stone surfaces. A high proportion of surviving historic and prehistoric rock art is found in caves or partly enclosed rock shelters; this type also may be called cave art or parietal art. A global phenomenon, rock art is found in many culturally diverse regions of the world. It has been produced in many contexts throughout human history. In terms of technique, the four main groups are:

- cave paintings and petrographs,
- petroglyphs, which are carved or scratched into the rock surface,
- sculpted rock reliefs, and
- geoglyphs, which are formed on the ground.

The oldest known rock art dates from the Upper Palaeolithic period, having been found in Europe, Australia, Asia, and Africa. Anthropologists studying these artworks believe that they likely had magico-religious significance.

In scholarly texts, a petroglyph is a rock engraving, whereas a petrograph or pictograph is a rock painting. In common usage, the words are sometimes used interchangeably.

The archaeological sub-discipline of rock art studies first developed in the late-19th century among Francophone scholars studying the rock art of the Upper Palaeolithic found in the cave systems of parts of Western Europe. Rock art continues to be of importance to indigenous peoples in various parts of the world, who view them as both sacred items and significant components of their cultural heritage. Such archaeological sites may become significant sources of cultural tourism and have been used in popular culture for their aesthetic qualities.

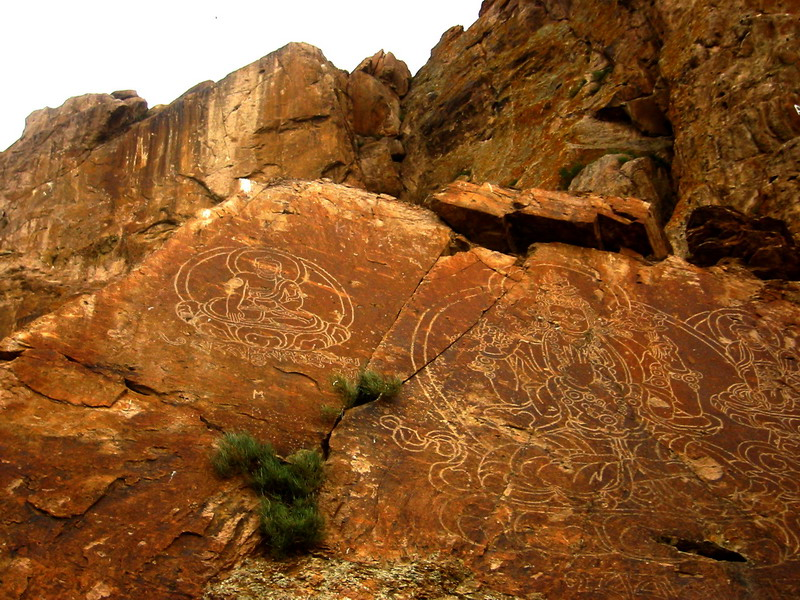
Buddhist stone carvings at Ili River, Kazakhstan

== Etymology ==
The term rock art appears in the published literature as early as the 1940s. It has also been described as "rock carvings", "rock drawings", "rock engravings", "rock inscriptions", "rock paintings", "rock pictures", "rock records", "rock sculptures", cave art, and parietal art.

== Background ==
Parietal art is a term for art in caves; this definition usually extended to art in rock shelters under cliff overhangs. Popularly, it is called "cave art", and is a subset of the wider term, rock art. It is mostly on rock walls, but may be on ceilings and floors. A wide variety of techniques have been used in its creation. The term usually is applied only to prehistoric art, but it may be used for art of any date. Sheltered parietal art has had a far better chance of surviving for very long periods, and what now survives may represent only a very small proportion of what was created.

Both parietal and cave art refer to cave paintings, drawings, etchings, carvings, and pecked artwork on the interior of caves and rock shelters. Generally, these either are engraved (essentially meaning scratched) or painted, or, they are created using a combination of the two techniques. Parietal art is found very widely throughout the world, and in many places new examples are being discovered.

The defining characteristic of rock art is that it is placed on natural rock surfaces; in this way, it is distinct from artworks placed on constructed walls or free-standing sculpture. As such, rock art is a form of landscape art, and includes designs that have been placed on boulder and cliff faces, cave walls, and ceilings, and on the ground surface. Rock art is a global phenomenon, being found in many different regions of the world. There are various forms of rock art. Some archaeologists also consider pits and grooves in the rock known as cupules, or cups or rings, as a form of rock art.

Although there are exceptions, the majority of rock art whose creation was recorded by ethnographers had been produced during rituals. As such, the study of rock art is a component of the archaeology of religion.

Rock art serves multiple purposes in the contemporary world. In several regions, it remains spiritually important to indigenous peoples, who view it as a significant component of their cultural heritage. It also serves as an important source of cultural tourism, and hence as economic revenue in certain parts of the world. As such, images taken from cave art have appeared on memorabilia and other artifacts sold as a part of the tourist industry.

== Types ==
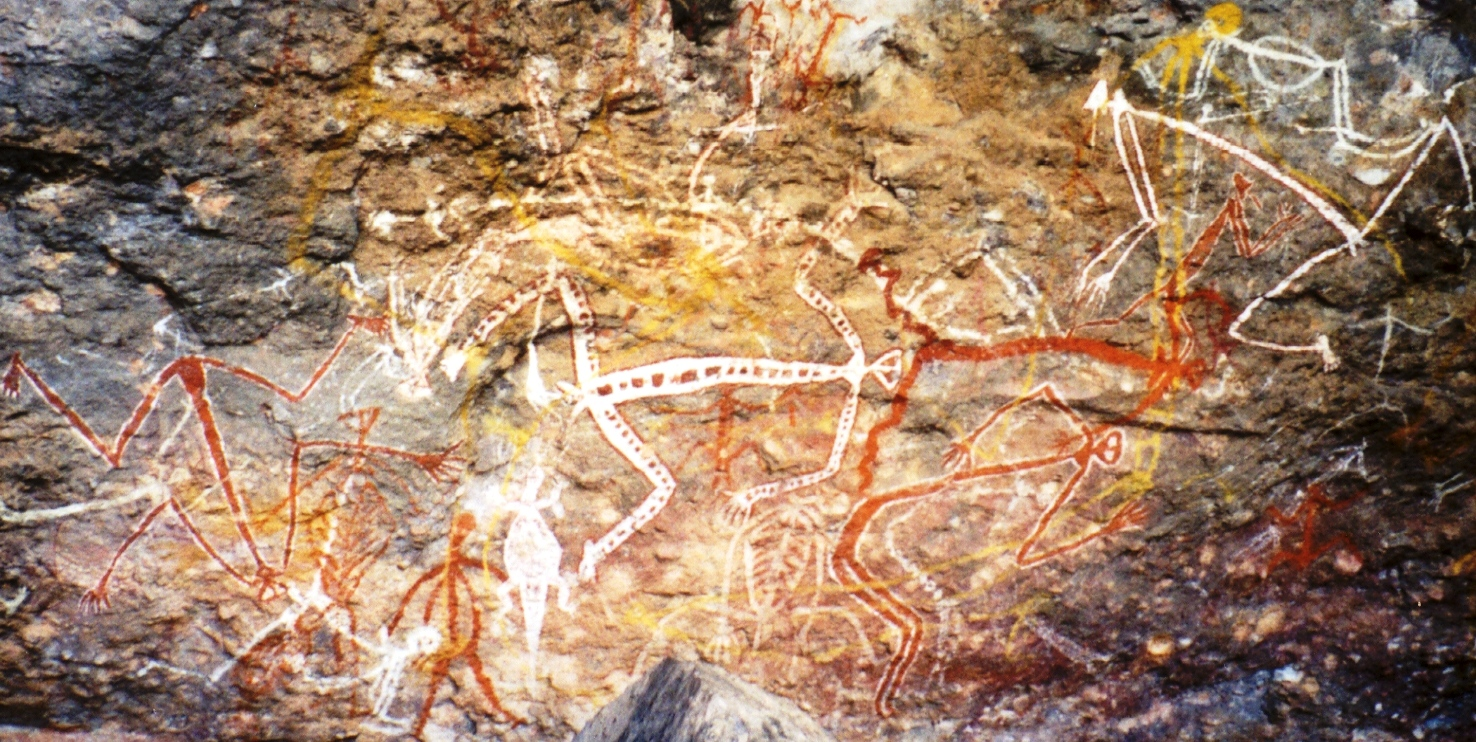
Aboriginal rock painting of Mimi spirits in the Anbangbang gallery at Nourlangie Rock in Kakadu National Park.

=== Paintings ===
In most climates, only paintings in sheltered sites, in particular caves, have survived for any length of time. Therefore, these are usually called "cave paintings", although many do survive in "rock-shelters" or cliff-faces under an overhang. In prehistoric times, these were often popular places for various human purposes, providing some shelter from the weather, as well as light. There may have been many more paintings in more exposed sites, that are now lost. Pictographs are paintings or drawings that have been placed onto the rock face. Such artworks have typically been made with mineral earths and other natural compounds found across much of the world. The predominantly used colours are red, black and white. Red paint is usually attained through the use of ground ochre, while black paint is typically composed of charcoal, or sometimes from minerals such as manganese. White paint is usually created from natural chalk, kaolinite clay or diatomaceous earth. Once the pigments had been obtained, they would be ground and mixed with a liquid, such as water, blood, urine, or egg yolk, and then applied to the stone as paint using a brush, fingers, or a stamp. Alternately, the pigment could have been applied on dry, such as with a stick of charcoal. In some societies, the paint itself has symbolic and religious meaning; for instance, among hunter-gatherer groups in California, paint was only allowed to be traded by the group shamans, while in other parts of North America, the word for "paint" was the same as the word for "supernatural spirit".

One common form of pictograph, found in many, although not all rock-art producing cultures, is the hand print. There are three forms of this; the first involves covering the hand in wet paint and then applying it to the rock. The second involves a design being painted onto the hand, which is then in turn added to the surface. The third involves the hand first being placed against the panel, with dry paint then being blown onto it through a tube, in a process that is akin to air-brush or spray-painting. The resulting image is a negative print of the hand, and is sometimes described as a "stencil" in Australian archaeology. Miniature stencilled art has been found at two locations in Australia and one in Indonesia.

=== Petroglyphs ===
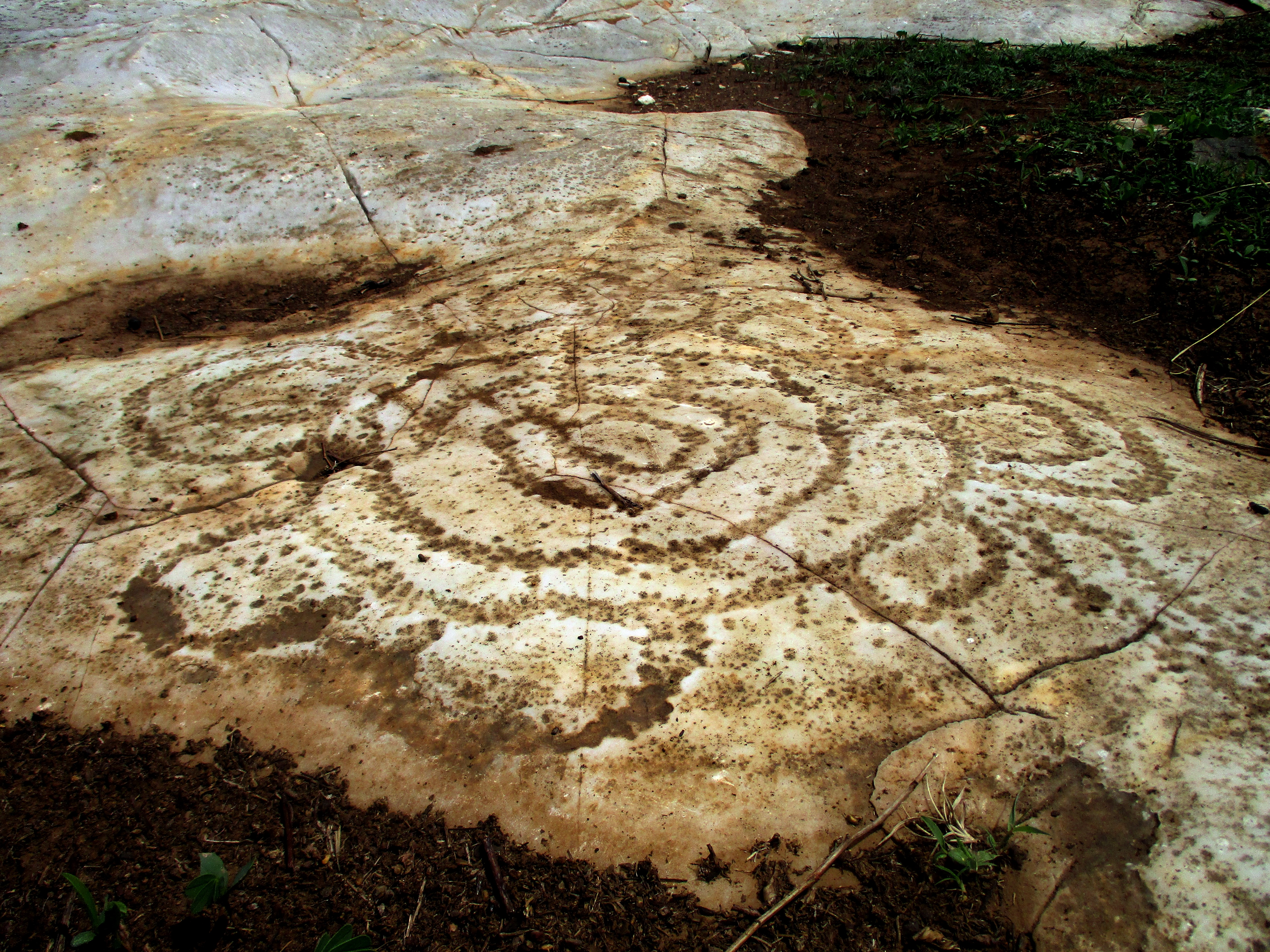
Bidzar Petroglyphs in Cameroon

Petroglyphs are engravings or carvings into rock which is left in situ. They can be created with a range of scratching, engraving or carving techniques, often with the use of a hard hammerstone, which is battered against the stone surface. In certain societies, the choice of hammerstone itself has religious significance. In other instances, the rock art is pecked out through indirect percussion, as a second rock is used like a chisel between the hammerstone and the panel. A third, rarer form of engraving rock art was through incision, or scratching, into the surface of the stone with a lithic flake or metal blade. The motifs produced using this technique are fine-lined and often difficult to see.

=== Rock reliefs ===
Normally found in literate cultures, a rock relief or rock-cut relief is a relief sculpture carved on solid or "living rock" such as a cliff, rather than a detached piece of stone. They are a category of rock art, and sometimes found in conjunction with rock-cut architecture. However, they tend to be omitted in most works on rock art, which concentrate on engravings and paintings by prehistoric peoples. A few such works exploit the natural contours of the rock and use them to define an image, but they do not amount to man-made reliefs. Rock reliefs have been made in many cultures, and were especially important in the art of the Ancient Near East. Rock reliefs are generally fairly large, as they need to be to make an impact in the open air. Most have figures that are over life-size, and in many the figures are multiples of life-size.

Stylistically they normally relate to other types of sculpture from the culture and period concerned, and except for Hittite and Persian examples they are generally discussed as part of that wider subject. The vertical relief is most common, but reliefs on essentially horizontal surfaces are also found. The term typically excludes relief carvings inside caves, whether natural or themselves man-made, which are especially found in India. Natural rock formations made into statues or other sculpture in the round, most famously at the Great Sphinx of Giza, are also usually excluded. Reliefs on large boulders left in their natural location, like the Hittite İmamkullu relief, are likely to be included, but smaller boulders may be called stelae or carved orthostats.

=== Earth figures ===
Earth figures are large designs and motifs that are created on the stone ground surface. They can be classified through their method of manufacture. Intaglios are created by scraping away the desert pavements (pebbles covering the ground) to reveal a negative image on the bedrock below. The best known example of such intaglio rock art is the Nazca Lines of Peru. In contrast, geoglyphs are positive images, which are created by piling up rocks on the ground surface to resulting in a visible motif or design.

== Motifs and panels ==
Traditionally, individual markings are called motifs and groups of motifs are known as panels. Sequences of panels are treated as archaeological sites. This method of classifying rock art however has become less popular as the structure imposed is unlikely to have had any relevance to the art's creators. Even the word 'art' carries with it many modern prejudices about the purpose of the features.

Rock art can be found across a wide geographical and temporal spread of cultures perhaps to mark territory, to record historical events or stories or to help enact rituals. Some art seems to depict real events whilst many other examples are apparently entirely abstract.

Prehistoric rock depictions were not purely descriptive. Each motif and design had a "deep significance" that is not always understandable to modern scholars.

== Interpretation and use ==
=== Religious interpretations ===
In many instances, the creation of rock art was itself a ritual act.

== Regional variations ==
=== Europe ===
In the Upper Palaeolithic of Europe, rock art was produced inside cave systems by the hunter-gatherer peoples who inhabited the continent. The oldest known example is the Chauvet Cave in France, although others have been located, including Lascaux in France, Alta Mira in Spain and Creswell Crags in Britain and Grotta del Genovese in Sicily.

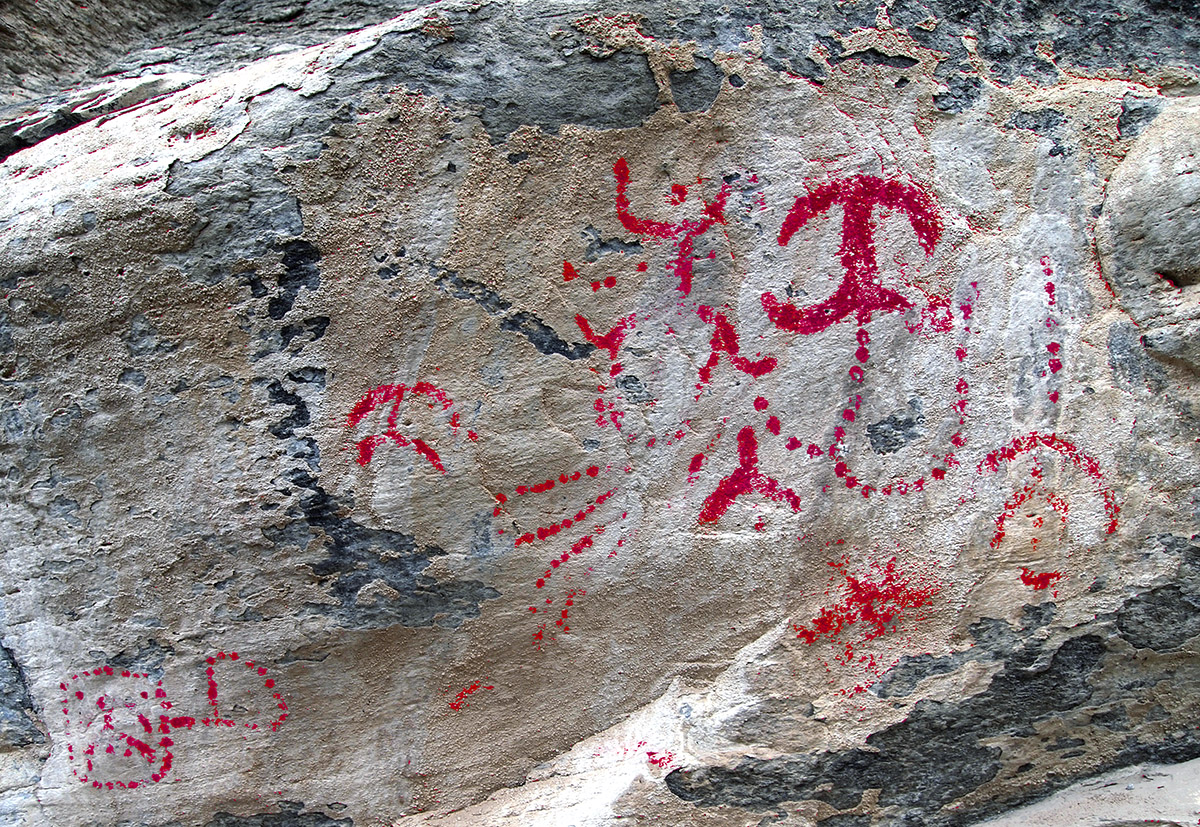
Balma dei Cervi post-palaeolithic rock paintings (Italian western Alps): anthropomorphic figures and dottings (DStretch enhanced)

The late prehistoric rock art of Europe has been divided into three regions by archaeologists. In Atlantic Europe, the coastal seaboard on the west of the continent, which stretches from Iberia up through France and encompasses the British Isles, a variety of different rock arts were produced from the Neolithic through to the Late Bronze Age. A second area of the continent to contain a significant rock art tradition was that of Alpine Europe, with the majority of artworks being clustered in the southern slopes of the mountainous region, in what is now south-eastern France and northern Italy.

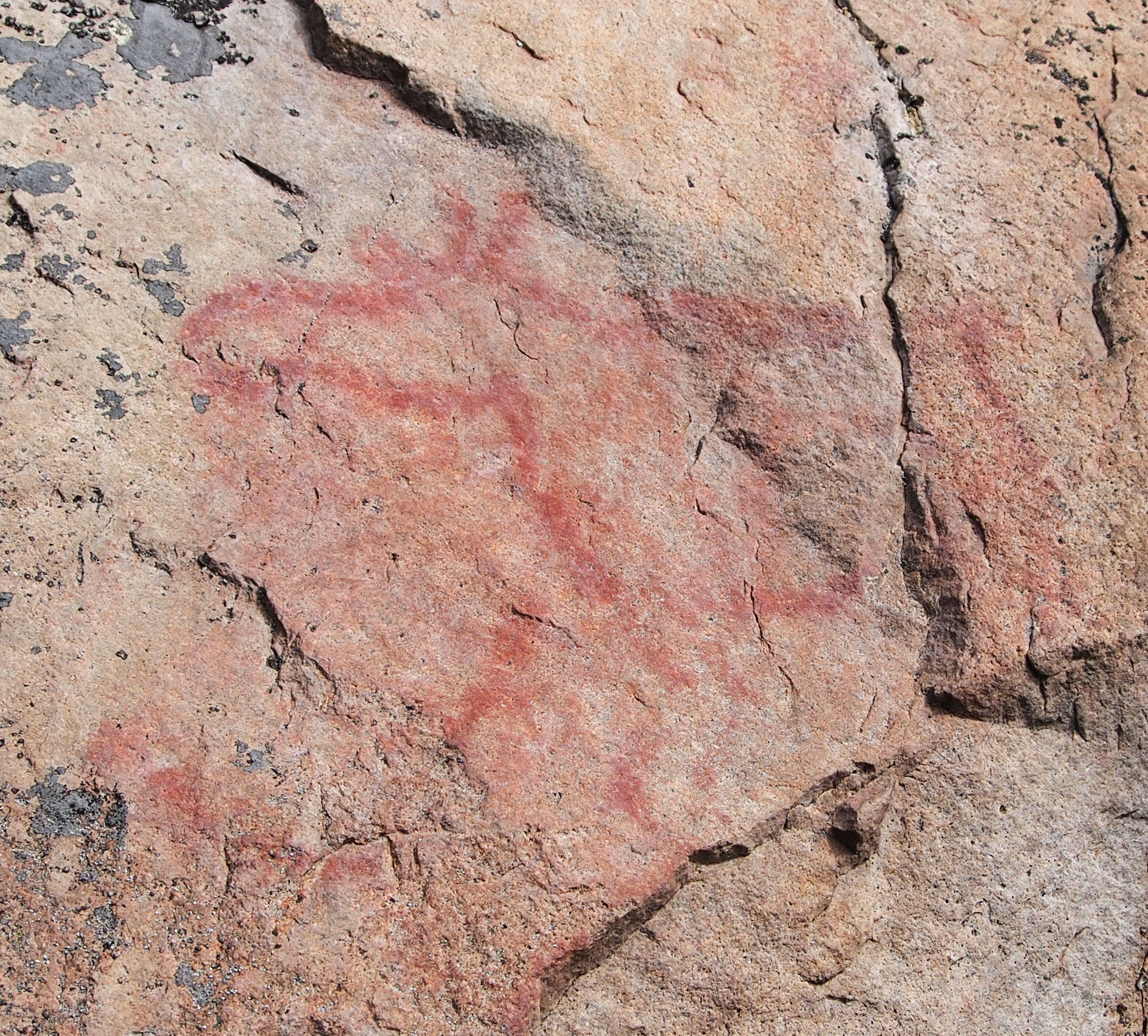
A moose in the rock paintings of Saraakallio in Laukaa, Finland

- Finnish Rock Art
- Knowth
- Loughcrew
- Newgrange
- Neolithic and Bronze Age rock art in the British Isles
- Rock Drawings in Valcamonica (World Heritage Site)
- Balma dei Cervi at Crodo (Piedmont - Italian Alps)
- Grotta dei Cervi at Porto Badisco (Italy)
- Grotta del Genovese (Sicily)
- List of rock carvings in Norway
  - Rock carvings at Alta (World Heritage Site)
- Madara Rider (World Heritage Site)
- Côa Valley Paleolithic Art (World Heritage Site)
- Cave of Altamira and Paleolithic Cave Art of Northern Spain (World Heritage Site)
- Rock art of the Iberian Mediterranean Basin (World Heritage Site)
- Tanum (World Heritage Site)
- Tanums hällristningsmuseum, Rock Art Research Centre and World Heritage Archive, situated in Tanum, Sweden.

=== Africa ===
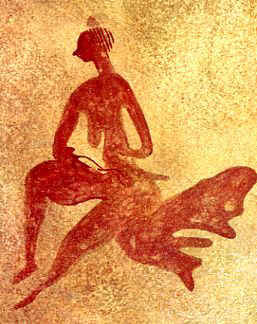
Figure of a woman at the Tassili n'Ajjer mountain range

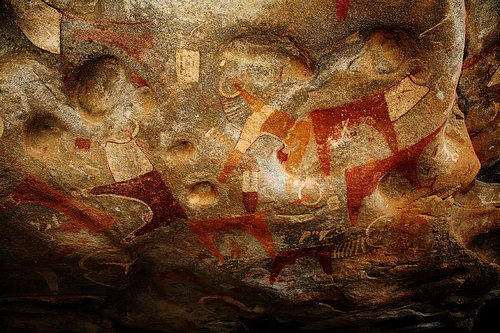
Long-horned cattle and other rock art in the Laas Geel complex

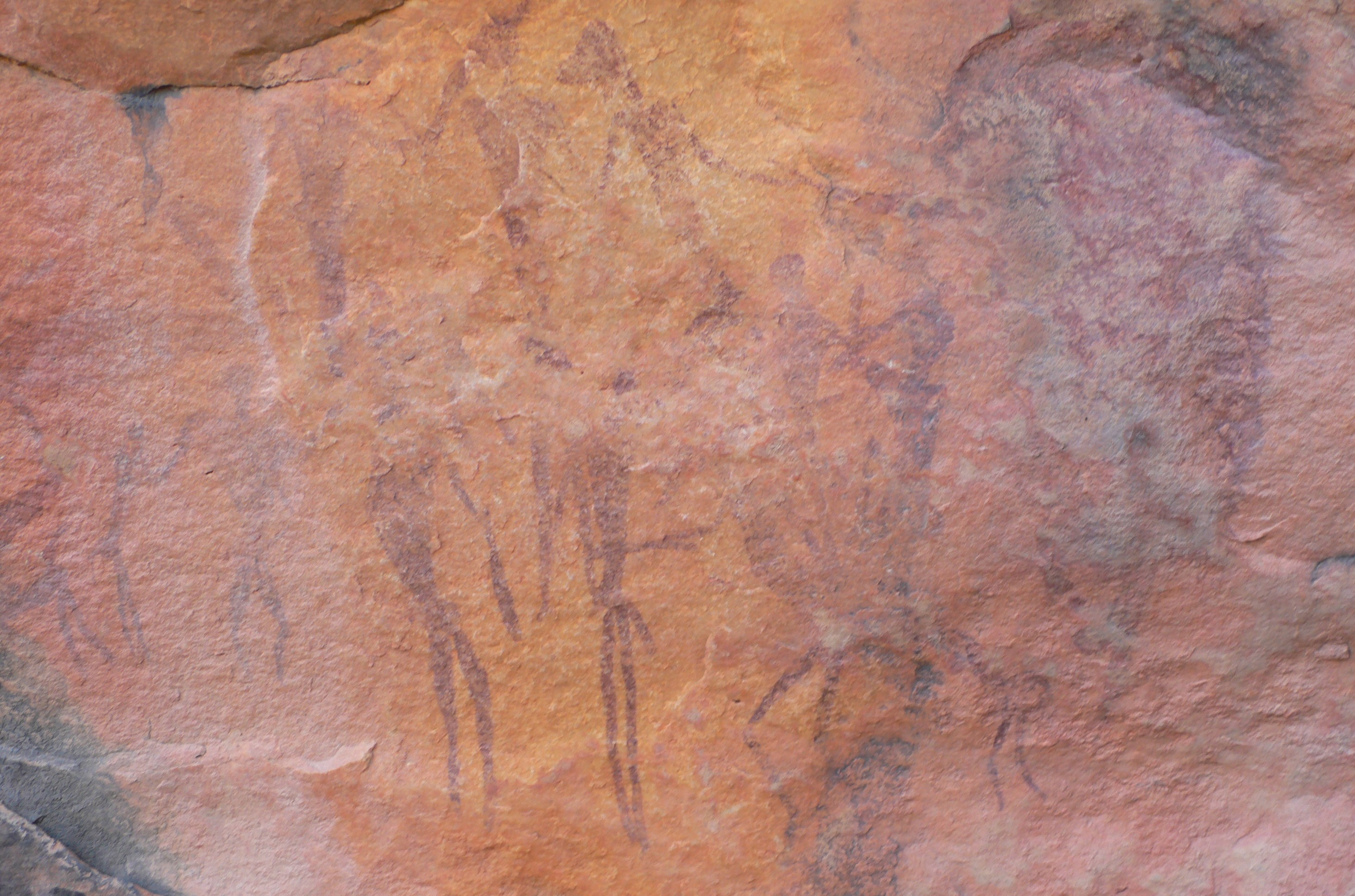
Rock paintings from the Western Cape

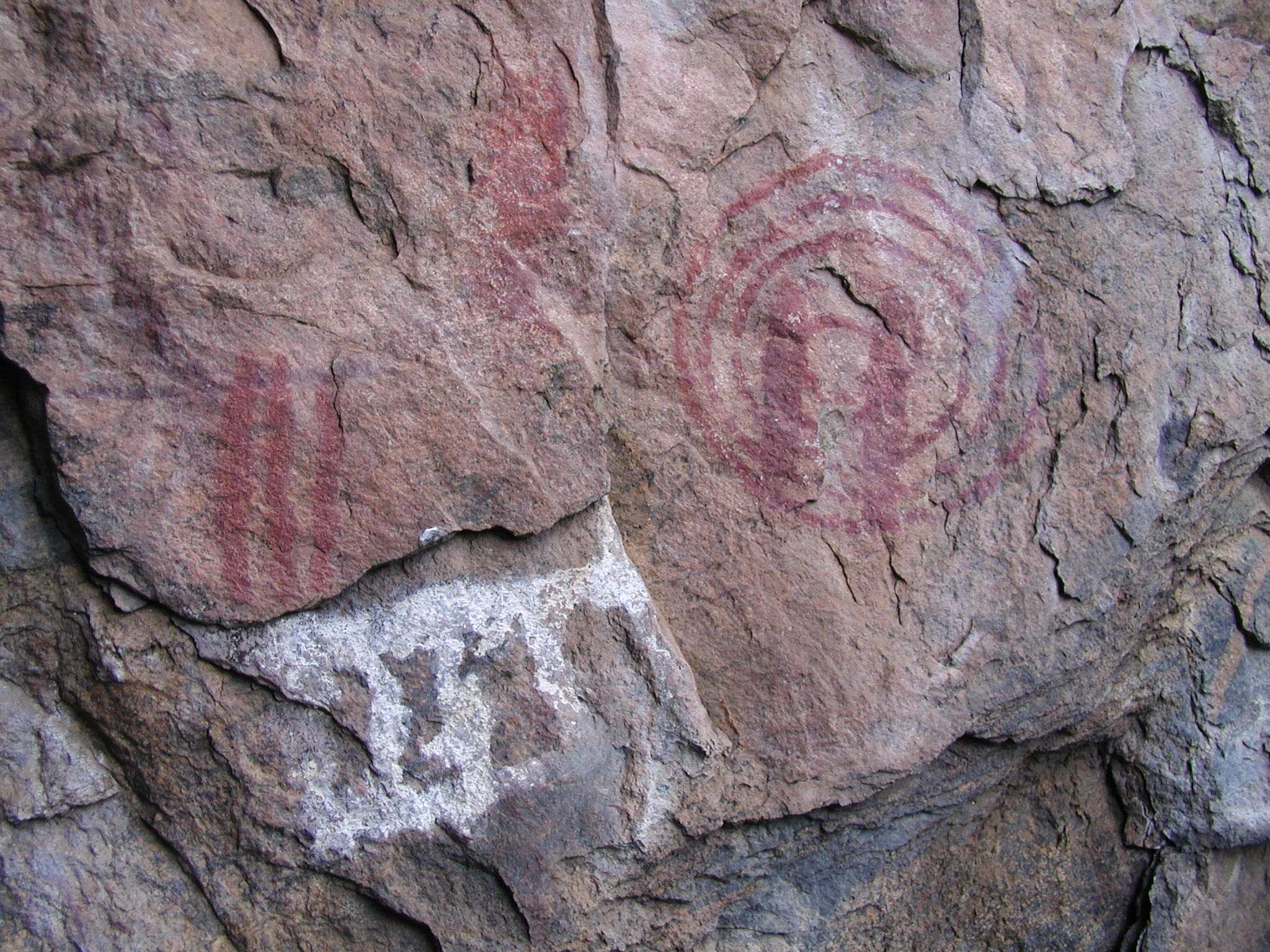
Chongoni Rock Art Area, Malawi

==== North Africa ====
- South Oran in Algeria.
- Saharan rock art
- Tadrart Acacus in Libya – World Heritage Site.
- Tassili n'Ajjer in Algeria – national park and World Heritage Site, known for its 10,000-year-old paintings.
- Cave of Swimmers is a cave in southwest Egypt, near the border with Libya, along the western edge of the Gilf Kebir plateau in the central Libyan Desert (Eastern Sahara). It was discovered in October 1933 by the Hungarian explorer László Almásy. The site contains rock paintings of human figures who appear to be swimming, which have been estimated to have been created at least 6,000 to 7000 years ago. The Cave of Beasts 10 km westwards was discovered in 2002.
- Jebel Uweinat, a large granite and sandstone mountain, as well as the adjacent smaller massifs of Jebel Arkenu and Jebel Kissu at the converging triple borders of Libya, Egypt and Sudan, harbors one of the richest concentrations of prehistoric rock art in the entire Sahara. The rock art here mainly consists of the Neolithic cattle pastoralist cultures, but also a number of older paintings from hunter-gatherer societies.
- Sabu-Jaddi rock art site in Northern Sudan.
- North Sİnai Archaeological Sites Zone − tentative World Heritage Site. Limestone cave decorated with scenes of animals such as donkeys, camels, deer, mule and mountain goats was uncovered in the site in 2020. Rock art cave is 15 meters deep and 20 meters high.
- Wadi Abu Dom

==== Western Africa ====
- Boucle du Baoulé National Park
- Dabous Giraffes

==== East Africa ====
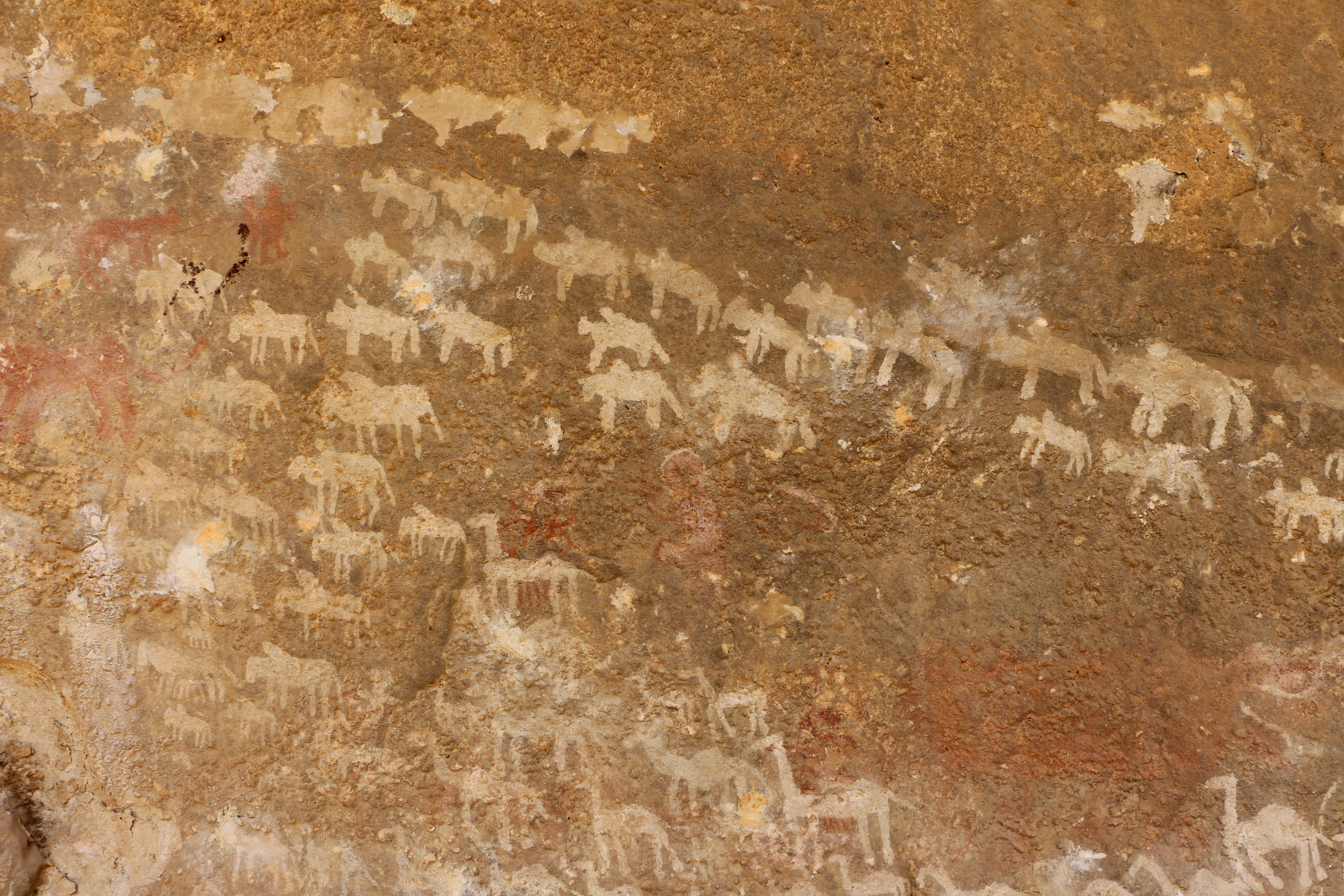
Rock art in the Adi Alauti cave, Eritrea

- Qohaito in Eritrea – 7,000 years old rock art near the ancient city Qohaito.
- Dorra and Balho in Djibouti – Rock art sites with figures of what appear to be antelopes and a giraffe.
- Kundudo in Ethiopia – Flat top mountain complex with rock art in a cave.
- Laas Geel in Somalia – A number of cave paintings and petroglyphs can be found at various sites across the country. Among the most prominent examples of this is the rock art in Laas Geel, Dhambalin, Gaanlibah and Karinhegane.
- Nyero Rockpaintings, Uganda - World Heritage Site, pre-historic paintings was noticed before 1250 AD
- Swaga Swaga Game Reserve in Tanzania – Archaeologists announced the discovery of ancient rock art with anthropomorphic figures in a good condition at the Amak’hee 4 rockshelter site. Paintings made with a reddish dye also contained buffalo heads, giraffe's head and neck, domesticated cattle dated back to about several hundred years ago.
- Bahi rock paintings
- Chabbé
- Dhaymoole
- Handoga
- Kondoa Rock-Art Sites
- Mfangano Island
- Rock art of Uganda

==== Southern Africa ====
Cave paintings are found in most parts of Southern Africa that have rock overhangs with smooth surfaces. Among these sites are the cave sandstone of Natal, Orange Free State and North-Eastern Cape, the granite and Waterberg sandstone of the Northern Transvaal, and the Table Mountain sandstone of the Southern and Western Cape.

- UKhahlamba Drakensberg Park in South Africa – The site has paintings dated to around 3,000 years old and which are thought to have been drawn by the San people and Khoisan people, who settled in the area some 8,000 years ago. The rock art depicts animals and humans and is thought to represent religious beliefs.
- Tsodilo Hills in Botswana – A World Heritage Site with rock art
- Brandberg Mountain (Daureb) in Namibia – It is one of the most important rock art localities on the African continent. Most visitors only see "The White Lady" shelter (which is neither white, nor a lady, the famous scene probably depicts a young boy in an initiation ceremony), however the upper reaches of the mountain is full of sites with prehistoric paintings, some of which rank among the finest artistic achievements of prehistory.
- Bambata Cave, Zimbabwe- Animal paintings and human drawings are supposed to be age from 2.000 to 20.000 years old
- Mwela and Adjacent Areas Rock Art Site, Zambia
- Chongoni Rock Art Area
- Driekops Eiland
- Modderpoort Sacred Sites
- Nooitgedacht Glacial Pavements
- Nyambwezi Falls
- San rock art
- Twyfelfontein
- Wildebeest Kuil Rock Art Centre

=== Americas ===
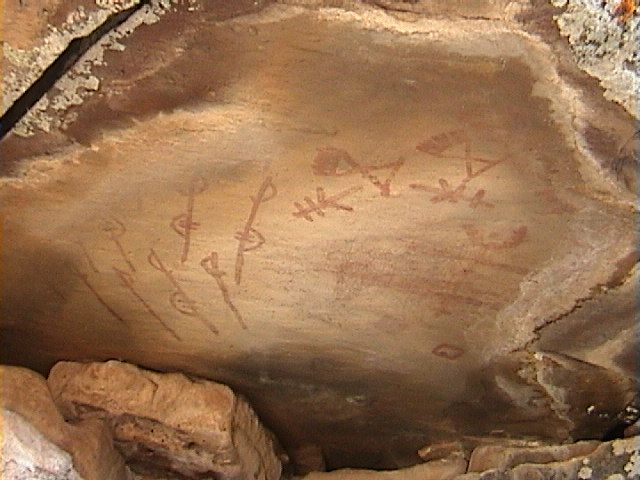
Native American rock painting close to Douglas, Wyoming, USA. One possible interpretation of this painting is: On the left side a group of United States Army soldiers with different insignia and on the right side Native Americans are shown

The oldest reliably dated rock art in the Americas is known as the "Horny Little Man". It is petroglyph depicting a stick figure with an oversized phallus and carved in Lapa do Santo, a cave in central-eastern Brazil. The most important site is Serra da Capivara National Park at Piauí state. It is a UNESCO World Heritage Site with the largest collection in the American continent and one of the most studied.

A site including eight miles of paintings or pictographs that is under study in Colombia, South America at Serranía de la Lindosa was revealed in November 2020. Their age is suggested as being 12,500 years old (c. 10,480 B.C.) by the anthropologists working on the site because of extinct fauna depicted.

Rock paintings or pictographs are located in many areas across Canada. There are over 400 sites attributed to the Ojibway from northern Saskatchewan to the Ottawa River.

- Pomier Caves, Dominican Republic
- Naj Tunich, Guatemala
- Rock Paintings of Sierra de San Francisco, Baja California, Mexico
- Sierra de Guadalupe cave paintings, Baja California, Mexico
- Pictograph Cave Complex, Billings, Montana, United States
- Cañon Pintado, Colorado, United States
- Chaco Culture National Historical Park, New Mexico, United States
- Chumash rock art, California, United States
- Coso Rock Art District, California, United States
- Hulkhuku, California, United States - The site of Hulkhuku is located in the San Emigdio Hills in South Central California. Archaeologists found that the rock art at the site was meant to be viewed by the general public and was not reserved for the elites of the society or for private rituals. This is based on evidence that the rock art is located in areas that were used by the public for everyday activities.
- Nine Mile Canyon, Utah, United States
- Quail rock art panel, Utah, United States
- Painted Rocks, Arizona, United States
- Petroglyph National Monument, New Mexico, United States
- Serra da Capivara National Park, Piauí, Brazil
- Vale do Catimbau National Park, Pernambuco, Brazil.
- Localidad Rupestre de Chamangá, Uruguay
- Writing-on-Stone Provincial Park, Alberta, Canada
- Cueva de las Manos, Santa Cruz Province, Argentina
- Huerfano Butte, Arizona, United States
- Petroglyphs Provincial Park, Ontario, Canada
- Serranía La Lindosa, Guaviare Department, Colombia
- Little Lake, Rose Valley, California, United States

However, cave art is not the only type of rock art. While cave art provides the two-dimensional view on a rocky surface, figurines made of a rock material can provide a three-dimensional view that gives insight on indigenous views towards their visual arts. Many sites along and off the California coastline, such as the Channel Islands and Malibu, have both realistic and abstract styles of zoomorphic effigy figurines. From archaeological studies at these sites, archaeologists and other researchers discovered many figurines and performed a composition analysis, finding most were made of steatite, though other materials were also used.

These figurines provided context about spheres of interaction between tribal groups, demonstrate economic significance, and may have held a ritual function. Archaeologists Richard T Fitzgerald and Christopher Corey dated the oldest figurines to the Middle Holocene, suggesting two socioeconomic interactive spheres (one in the northern and one in the southern Channel Islands) and linguistic similarities between Takic-speaking Gabrileno and Chumash neighbors. These figurines share similar styles, suggesting a history of intertribal contact.

==== California ====
Little Lake is a complex of rock art located in Rose Valley, Inyo County. Rose Valley is located in the boundaries of the cultural Great Basin and the territory of the Timbisha Shoshone. This site is important to understanding the symbolism and value of North American rock art because it is one of the largest collections of rock art unrelated to the Coso (an indigenous tribe/people of the Mojave Desert). Its importance to territorial and anthropological studies helps many understand the in-depth descriptions and stylistic analyses of large rock art concentrations, which are valued by archaeologists, anthropologists, ethnographers, and even art enthusiasts. Referring back to these sites help social scientists understand and record the values that were important to the creators; it shows economic values or settlement patterns that were once a daily part of life. As a result, it is crucial to focus on the variable resources to understand how cultures were abiding with their environment. However, rock art sites at Little Rock cannot be accurately dated.

=== Asia ===
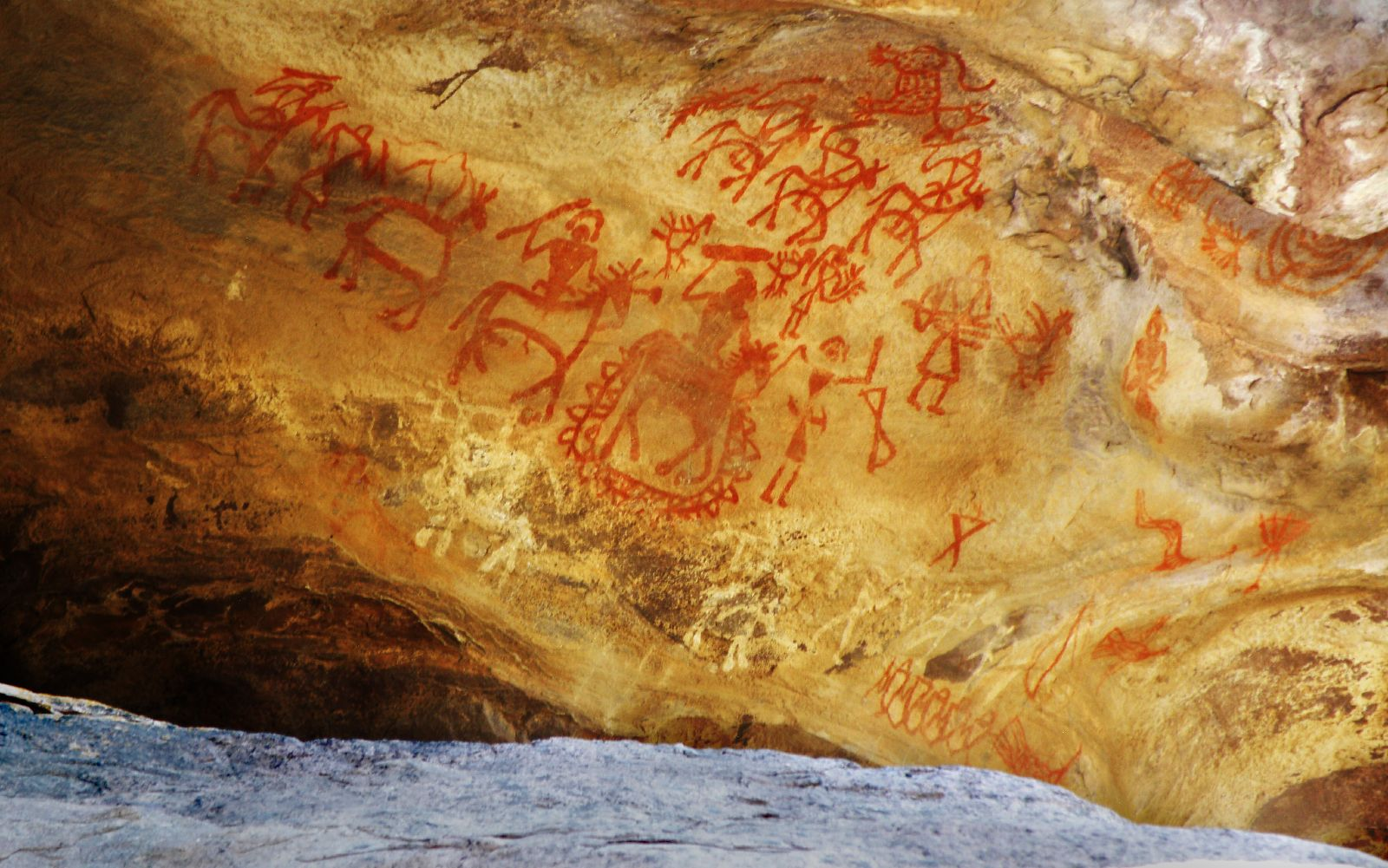
Bhimbetka rock painting of India, World Heritage Site.

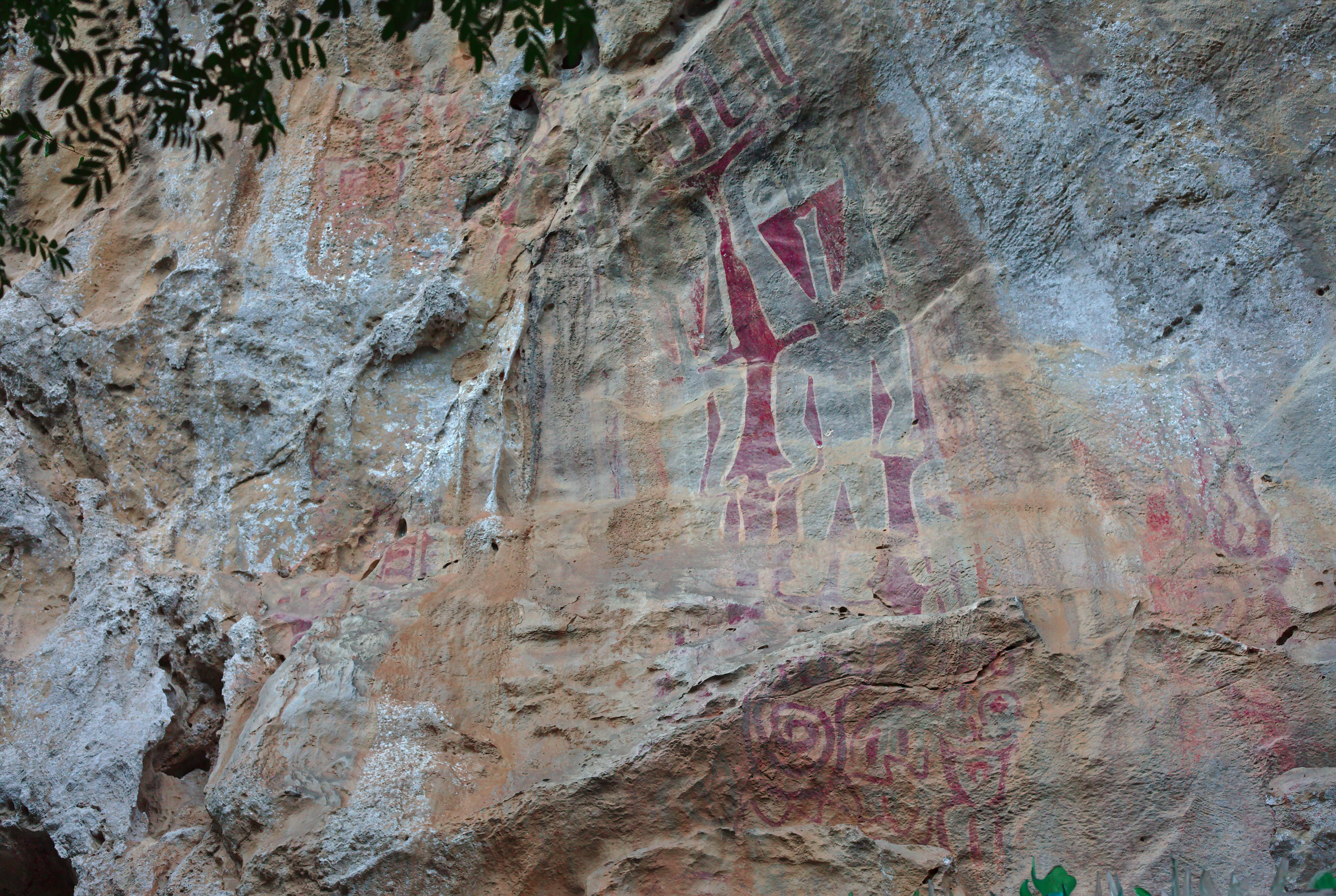
'Great King' Neolithic paintings above Malipo in Wenshan Prefecture, Yunnan Province, China. Thought to be over 4000 years old.

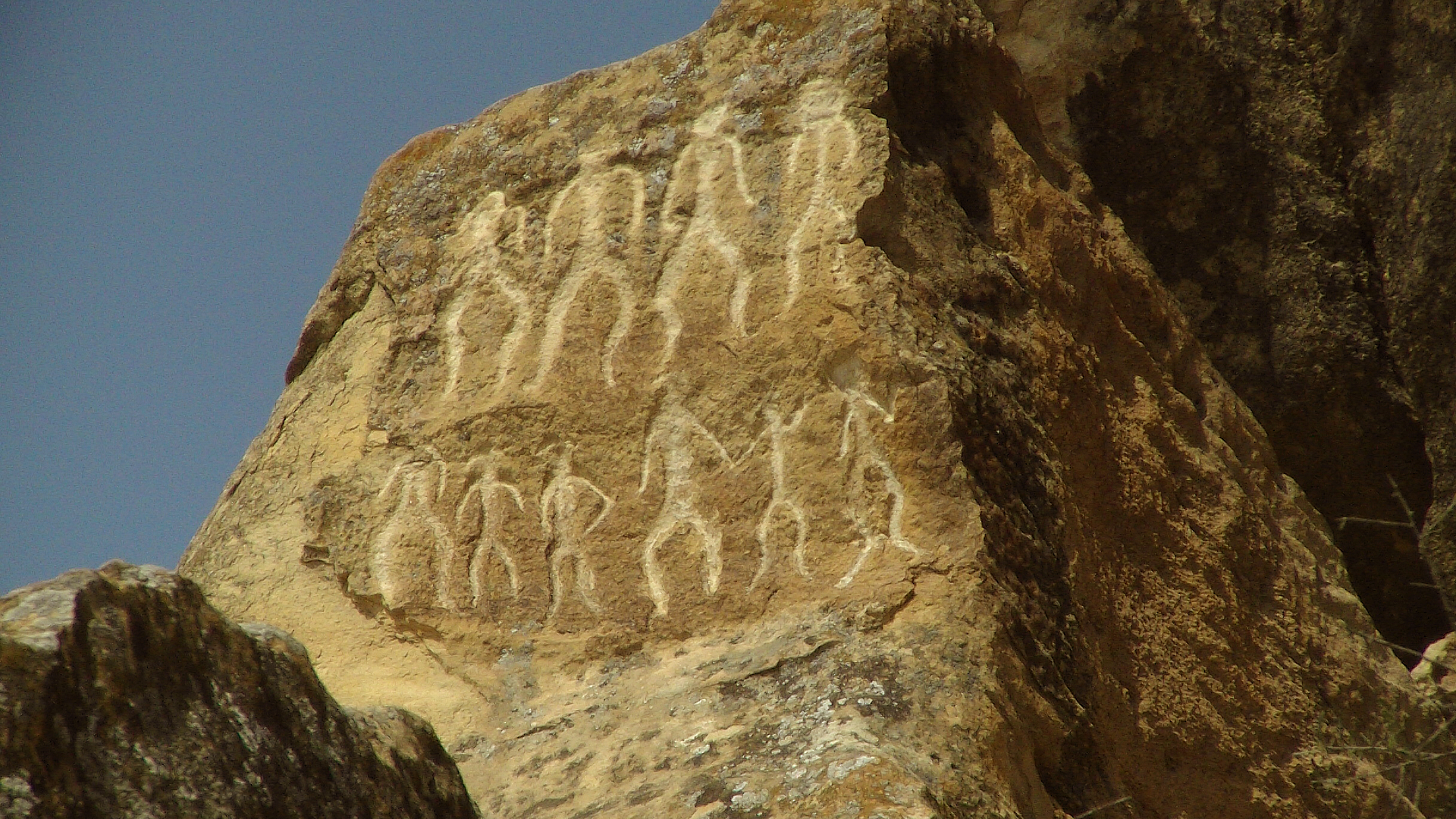
Petroglyphs in Gobustan, Azerbaijan, dating back to 10,000 BC.

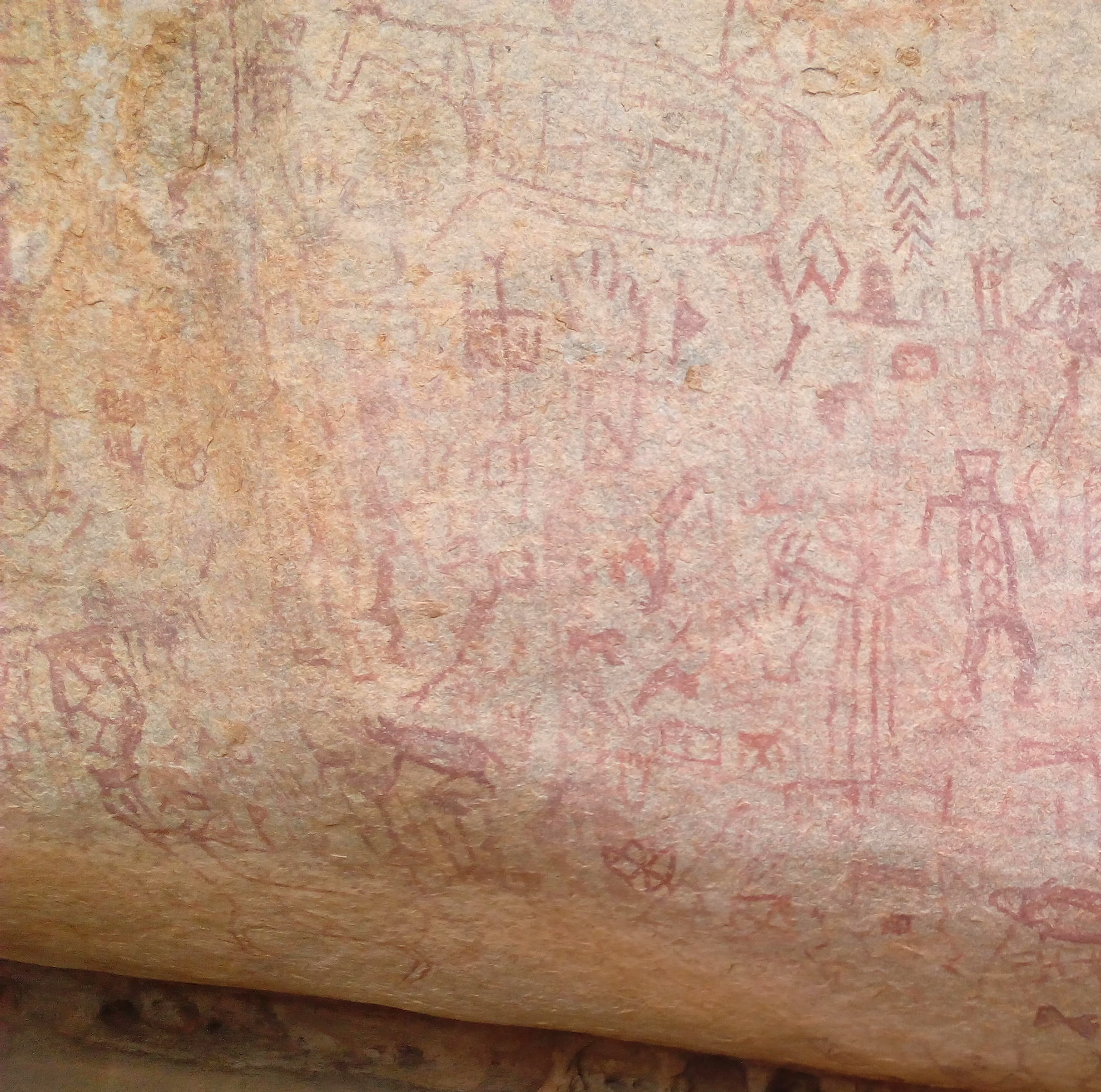
Rock art in Balichakra near Yadgir town in Karnataka, India

==== Central Asia ====
- Gobustan National Park in Azerbaijan
- Petroglyphs of Arpa-Uzen, Kazakhstan
- Siypantosh Rock Paintings in Uzbekistan
- Zarautsoy Rock Paintings in Uzbekistan

==== East Asia ====
- Bangudae Petroglyphs, in South Korea
- Cheonjeon-ri in South Korea
- Daegok-ri in South Korea
- Fugoppe Cave petroglyphs on Hokkaido, Japan
- Helankou in Yinchuan, China
- Kangjia shimenzi in Xinjiang, China
- Oponoho (Wanshan) petroglyphs in Taiwan
- Temiya Cave on Hokkaido, Japan
- Yinshan petroglyphs in the Yin Mountains, China
- Zuo River Huashan rock art in Guangxi, China
- Chifeng Petroglyphs in Inner Mongolia
- Above 4000 meters above sea level high Tibetan Plateau: possibly the oldest rock art, likely dating back to ~169–226,000 years ago, much older than what was previously thought to be the earliest known drawing, made ~73,000 years ago. According to the study, children likely intentionally placed a series of hands and feet in mud. The findings could also be the earliest evidence of Hominins on the high Tibetan Plateau.

==== Southeast Asia ====
- Angono Petroglyphs, the Philippines
- Bir Hima Rock Petroglyphs and Inscriptions
- Caves in the limestone karst systems, South Sulawesi, Indonesia – hand stencils, painted animals. These include the oldest known painted rock art figures in the world.
- Lubang Jeriji Saléh, Borneo
- Pha Taem in Thailand
- Tambun rock art, Malaysia

==== South Asia ====
- Bhimbetka rock shelters (World Heritage Site), Madhya Pradesh, India with rock art ranging from the Mesolithic (c.8,000 BC) to historical times
- Edakkal Caves, Kerala, India
- Gavali, Udupi, Karnataka, India
- Hire Benakal, Karnataka, India
- Balichakra, Yadgir town in Karnataka, India
- Sonda, Karnataka, India
- Rock paintings of Tamil Nadu, in India (several sites)
- Kaimur district, Bihar, India (several sites)
- Rock paintings of Andhra Pradesh, in India (several sites)

==== Western Asia ====
- Rock Art in the Ha'il Region in Saudi Arabia
- Iranian rock art sites are mostly found in the Zagros Mountain range. But there are many other sites in Central Iran, Sistan and Baluchistan, and Azarbaijan. Most of these rock arts date back to the late prehistory and historic period. Among which the well-known sites of Houmian at Kuhdasht, Khomein, and Teimareh in Central Iran are outstanding.
- Large carvings of camels that were discovered in 2018 in Saudi Arabia are estimated to be 7,000 to 8,000 years old. This Neolithic dating would make the carvings significantly older than Stonehenge (5,000 years old) and the Egyptian pyramids at Giza (4,500 years old).

=== Australasia ===
==== Australia ====
Australian Indigenous art represents the oldest unbroken tradition of art in the world. There are more than 100,000 recorded rock art sites in Australia.

The oldest firmly dated rock art painting in Australia is a charcoal drawing on a rock fragment found during the excavation of the Nawarla Gabarnmang rock shelter in southwestern Arnhem Land in the Northern Territory. Dated at 28,000 BP, it is one of the oldest known pieces of rock art on Earth with a confirmed date. Nawarla Gabarnmang has one of the most extensive collections of rock art in the world and predates both Lascaux and Chauvet cave art - the earliest known art in Europe - by at least 10,000 years.

In 2008 rock art depicting what is thought to be a Thylacoleo was discovered on the north-western coast of the Kimberley. As the Thylacoleo is believed to have become extinct 45000–46000 years ago (Roberts et al. 2001) (Gillespie 2004). This suggests a similar age for the associated Gwion Gwion rock paintings. Archaeologist Kim Akerman however believes that the megafauna may have persisted later in refugia (wetter areas of the continent) as suggested by Wells (1985: 228). Akerman has posited that the paintings are in fact much younger. Pigments from the Gwion Gwion of the Kimberley are so old they have become part of the rock itself, making carbon dating impossible. Some experts suggest that these paintings are in the vicinity of 50,000 years old and may even pre-date Aboriginal settlement.

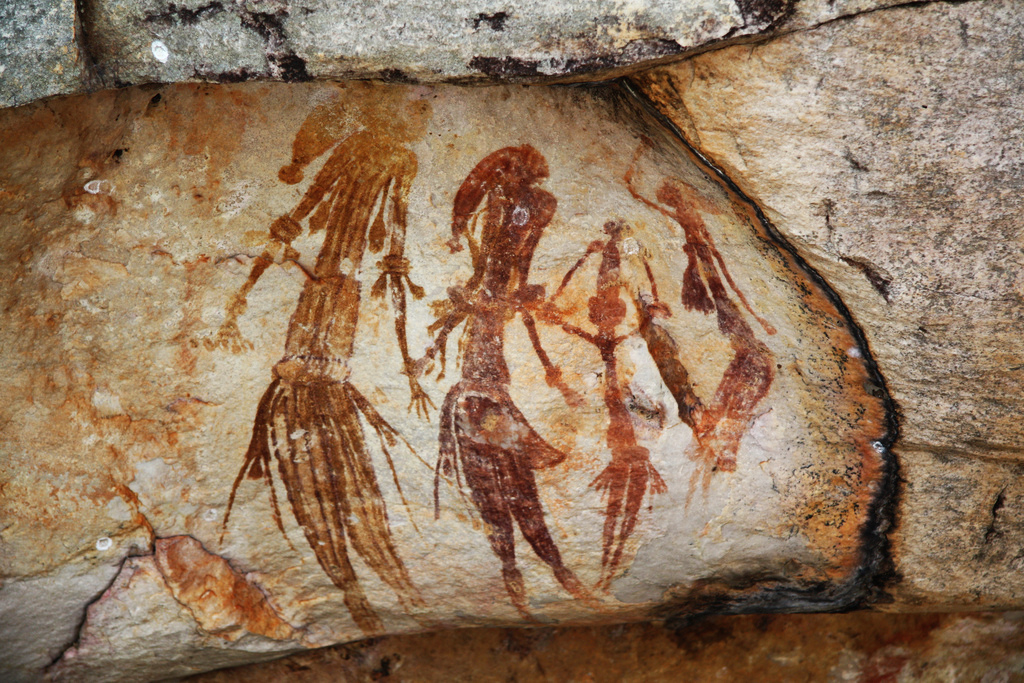
Gwion Gwion rock paintings in the Kimberley region of Western Australia

Miniature rock art of the stencilled variety at a rock shelter known as Yilbilinji, in the Limmen National Park in the Northern Territory, is one of only three known examples of such art. Usually stencilled art is life-size, using body parts as the stencil, but the 17 images of designs of human figures, boomerangs, animals such as crabs and long-necked turtles, wavy lines and geometric shapes are very rare. Found in 2017 by archaeologists, the only other recorded examples are at Nielson's Creek in New South Wales and at Kisar Island in Indonesia. It is thought that the designs may have been created by stencils fashioned out of beeswax.

- Kakadu National Park in the Northern Territory has a large collection of ochre paintings. Ochre is a not an organic material, so carbon dating of these pictures is impossible. Sometimes the approximate date, or at least an epoch, can be guessed from the content.
- The Sydney region has important rock engravings.
- Mount Grenfell Historic Site near Cobar, western New South Wales has important ancient rock-drawings.
- The Murujuga (Burrup Peninsula) area of Western Australia near Karratha is estimated to be home to between 500,000 and 1 million individual engravings.
- Kimberley region of Western Australia. Amateur archaeologist Grahame Walsh, who researched Gwion Gwion rock paintings in the region from 1977 until his death in 2007, produced a photographic database of 1.5 million Gwion Gwion rock paintings. Many of the Gwion rock paintings maintain vivid colours because they have been colonised by bacteria and fungi, such as the black fungus, Chaetothyriales. The pigments originally applied may have initiated an ongoing, symbiotic relationship between black fungi and red bacteria.
- The Grampians-Gariwerd region is Victoria is one of the richest Aboriginal rock art sites in south-eastern Australia. Some of the more well-known and easily accessible sites are the Ngamadjidj Shelter (Cave of Ghosts), Gulgurn Manja (Flat Rock), Billimina (Glenisla Shelter) and Manja (Cave of Hands); one of the most significant sites in south-eastern Australia is Bunjil's Shelter, near Stawell, which is the only known rock art depiction of Bunjil, the creator-being in Aboriginal Australian mythology.
- The Maliwawa Figures in Arnhem Land, a series of 571 paintings and a drawing, created between 6,000 and 9,400 years ago, show a style nor recognised by researchers in the field before new research was done in 2016–2018 and published in September 2020 by Paul Taçon and his team.
- The Turramurra site in western Queensland is opening in 2020. Cliffs on the property, for some time known as Grace Vale Station, are covered with ancient rock art, including paintings and etchings of megafauna, emu symbols and the traditional songline of the Seven Sisters. Planning for an educational centre created from local rock is under way.

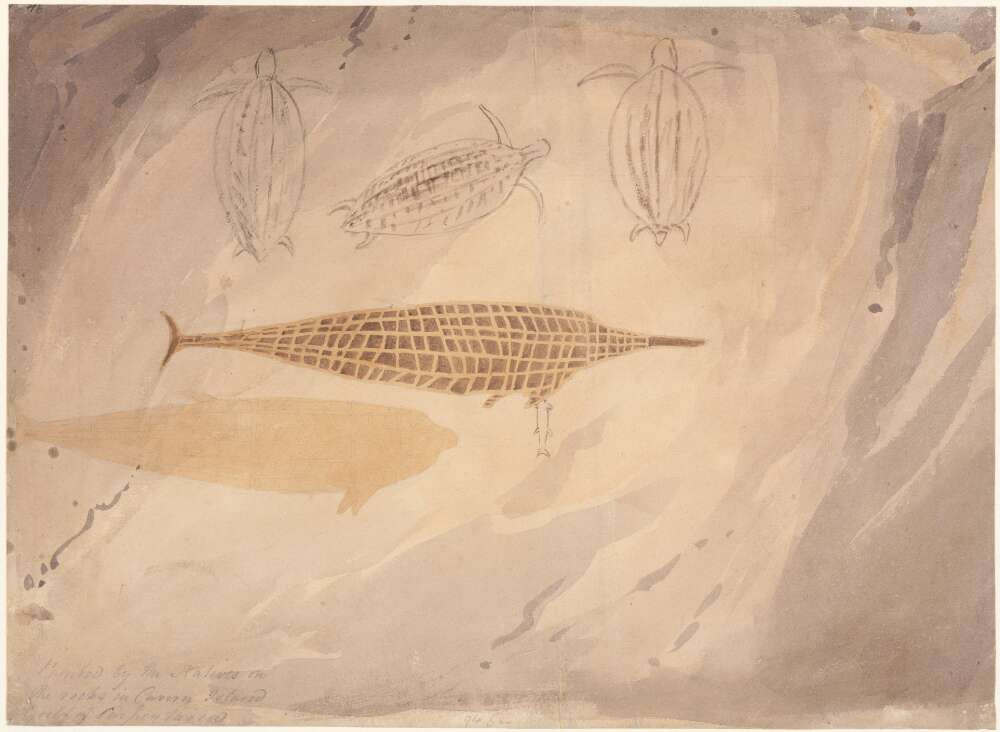
William Westall (1803) Chasm Island, native cave painting, 1803, watercolour

The first European discovery of aboriginal rock paintings took place on 14 January 1803. While on a surveying expedition along the shores and islands of the Gulf of Carpentaria, British navigator and explorer Matthew Flinders made landfall on rugged Chasm Island off Groote Eylandt.

Within the island's rock shelters, Flinders discovered an array of painted and stenciled patterns. To record these images, he enlisted the ship's artist, William Westall. Westall's two watercolour sketches are the earliest known documentation of Australian rock art. In his journal, Flinders not only detailed the location and the artworks but also authored the inaugural site report:

In the deep sides of the chasms were deep holes or caverns undermining the cliffs; upon the walls of which I found rude drawings, made with charcoal and something like red paint upon the white ground of the rock. These drawings represented porpoises, turtle, kanguroos [sic], and a human hand; and Mr. Westall, who went afterwards to see them, found the representation of a kanguroo [sic], with a file of thirty-two persons following after it. The third person of the band was twice the height of the others, and held in his hand something resembling the whaddie, or wooden sword of the natives of Port Jackson; and was probably intended to represent a chief. They could not, as with us, indicate superiority by clothing or ornament, since they wore none of any kind; and therefore, with the addition of a weapon, similar to the ancients, they seem to have made superiority of person the principal emblem of superior power, of which, indeed, power is usually a consequence in the very early stages of society.

==== New Zealand ====
In New Zealand, North Otago and South Canterbury have a rich range of early Māori rock art.

- The Takiroa Rock Art Shelter near Duntroon contains Māori artwork made from ochre and charcoal.

== Studies ==
The archaeological sub-discipline devoted to the investigation of rock art is known as "rock art studies". Rock art specialist David S. Whitley noted that research in this area required an "integrated effort" that brings together archaeological theory, method, fieldwork, analytical techniques and interpretation.

=== History ===
Although French archaeologists had undertaken much research into rock art, Anglophone archaeology had largely neglected the subject for decades.

The discipline of rock art studies witnessed what Whitley called a "revolution" during the 1980s and 1990s, as increasing numbers of archaeologists in the Anglophone world and Latin America turned their attention to the subject. In doing so, they recognised that rock art could be used to understand symbolic and religious systems, gender relations, cultural boundaries, cultural change and the origins of art and belief. One of the most significant figures in this movement was the South African archaeologist David Lewis-Williams, who published his studies of San rock art from southern Africa, in which he combined ethnographic data to reveal the original purpose of the artworks. Lewis-Williams would come to be praised for elevating rock art studies to a "theoretically sophisticated research domain" by Whitley. However, the study of rock art worldwide is marked by considerable differences of opinion with respect to the appropriateness of various methods and the most relevant and defensible theoretical framework.

=== International databases and archives ===
The UNESCO World Rock Art Archive Working Group met in 2011 to discuss the base model for a World Rock Art Archive. While no official output has been generated to date, various projects around the world — such as The Global Rock Art Database — are looking at making rock art heritage information more accessible and more visible to assist with rock art awareness, conservation and preservation issues.

== See also ==
- List of Stone Age art
- Mulka's Cave
- The Kindness Rocks Project
