= Laas Geel =

Cave painting in Hargeisa, Somaliland

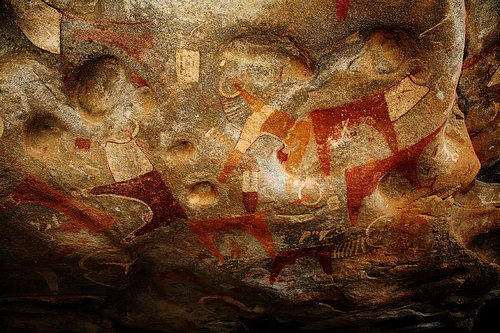
- Long-horned cattle and other rock art in the cave complex.

- Location within Marodi Jeh Location within Somaliland
- Location: Hargeisa, Marodi Jeh, Somaliland
- Coordinates: 9°46′51.28″N 44°26′37.11″E
- Discovery: 2002
- Access: Public

Laas Geel (Somali: Laas Geel), also spelled Laas Gaal, are cave formations on the rural outskirts of Hargeisa, Somaliland, situated in the Maroodi Jeex region of the country. They contain some of the earliest known cave paintings of domesticated African aurochs (Bos primigenius africanus) in the Horn of Africa. Laas Geel's rock art is estimated to be approximately 5,500 to 4,500 years old.

== Discovery ==
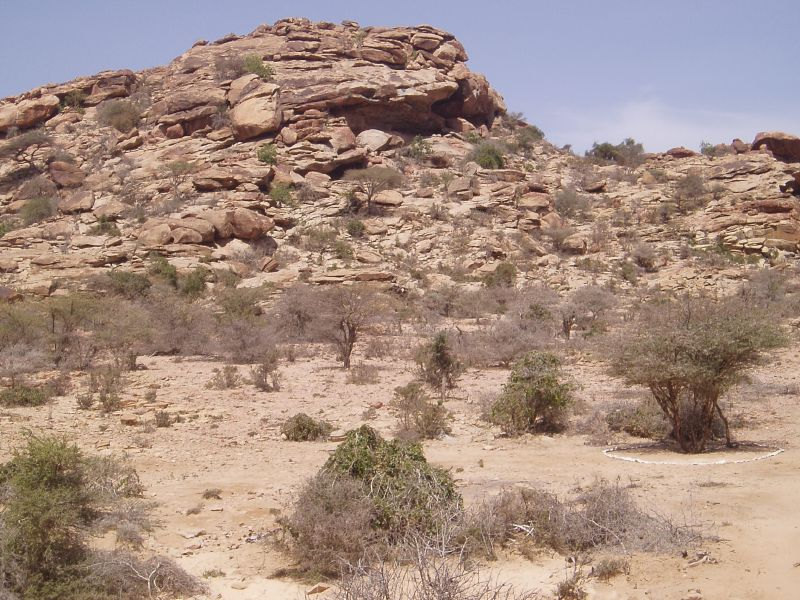
Laas Geel rock exterior

During November and December 2002, an archaeological survey was carried out in Somaliland by a French team of researchers. The expedition's objective was to search for rock shelters and caves that contained archaeological sediments and infills in order to document the historical period when production economy appeared in this part of the Horn of Africa (circa 5,000 to 2,000 years BCE). During the course of the survey, the excavation team discovered the Laas Geel cave paintings, that encompass an area of ten rock alcoves (caves). In an excellent state of preservation, the rock art depicts wild animals and decorated cattle (cows and bulls). They also feature herders, who are believed to be the creators of the paintings. Laas Geel's rock art is executed in the same distinctive Ethiopian-Arabian style as the Dhambalin and Karinhegane cave paintings that are also situated in Somaliland.

Although the Laas Geel rock art had been known to the area's inhabitants for centuries, its existence only came to international attention after the 2002 discovery. In November 2003, a mission returned to Laas Geel and a team of experts undertook a detailed study of the paintings in their prehistoric context.

Somaliland in general, is home to numerous such archaeological sites and megalithic structures, with similar rock art found at Haadh, Gudmo Biyo Cas, Dhambalin, Dhagah Maroodi and numerous other sites, while ancient edifices are, among others, found at Sheikh, Aynabo, Aw-Barkhadle, Ancient Amud, Heis, Maydh, Haylan, Qa’ableh, Qombo'ul and El Ayo. However, many of these old structures have yet to be properly explored, a process which would help shed further light on local history and facilitate their preservation for posterity.

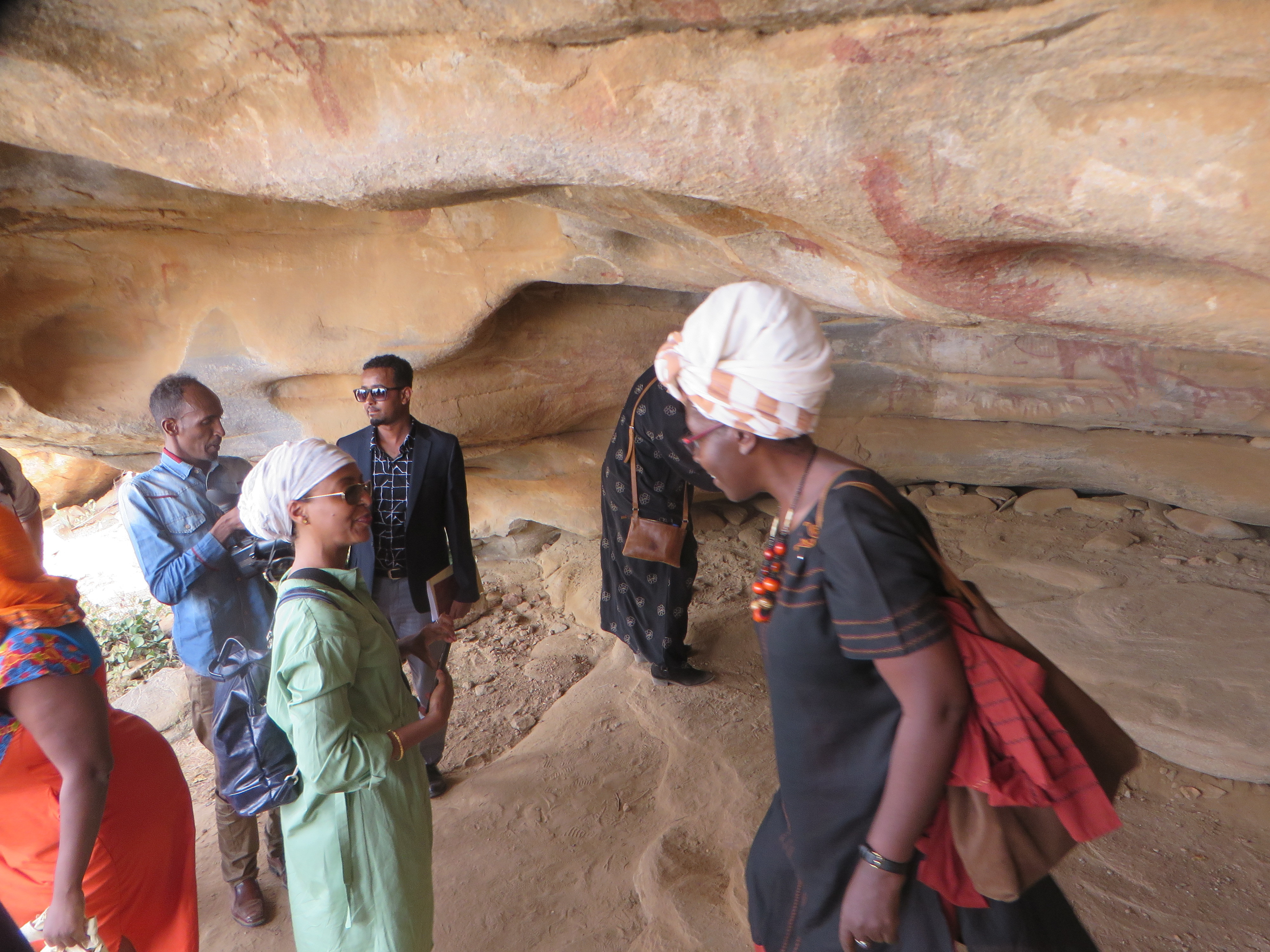
Foreign tourists with local guides in the caves of Laas Geel

== Description ==
The Laas Geel cave paintings are thought to be some of the most vivid rock art in Africa. Among other things, they depict cattle in ceremonial robes accompanied by humans, who are believed to have been inhabitants of the region. The necks of the cattle are embellished with a kind of plastron. Some of the cattle are also portrayed wearing decorative robes. Besides long-horned cattle, the rock art also shows an image of a domesticated dog, several paintings of Canidae as well as a giraffe. The site is excellently preserved due to the location of the paintings which are covered by the granite overhangs.

== Demographics ==
Laas Geel is primarily inhabited by people from the Somali ethnic group, with the clan eponyms of Adam Isa and Abokor Isa of Isamusa especially well-represented.

== Gallery ==
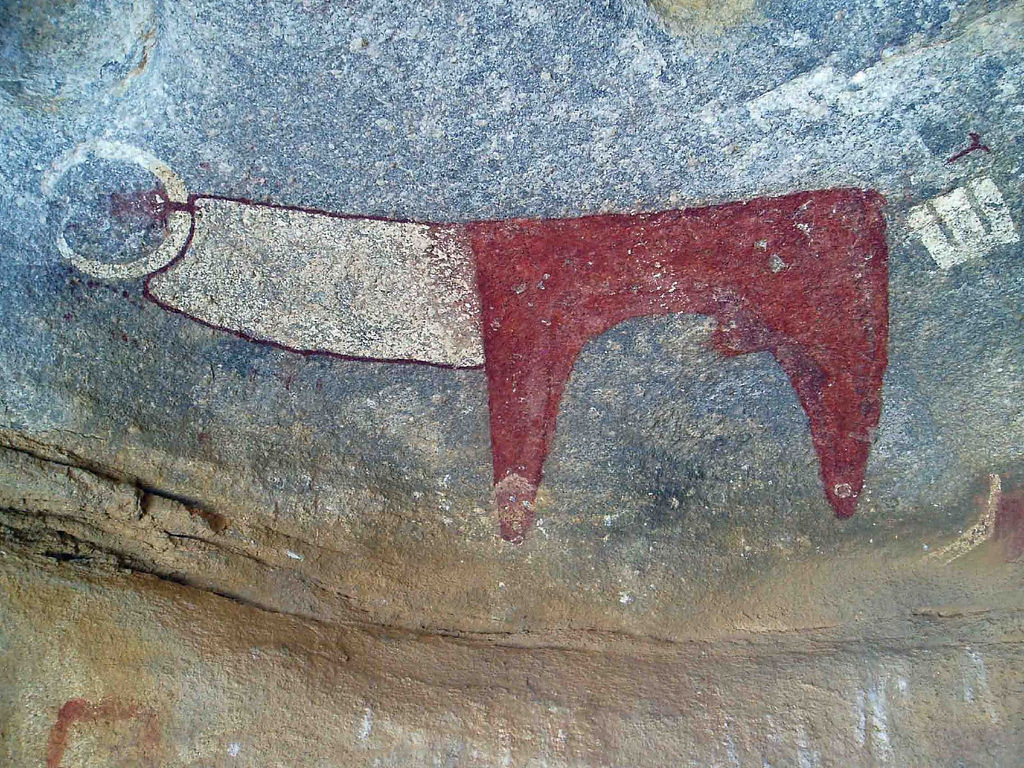
Depiction of a ceremonial cow

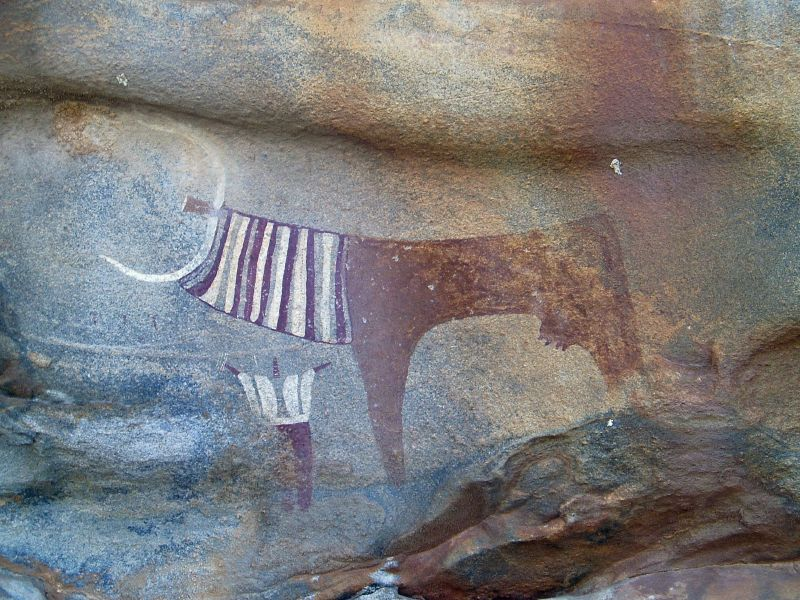
A human and cow

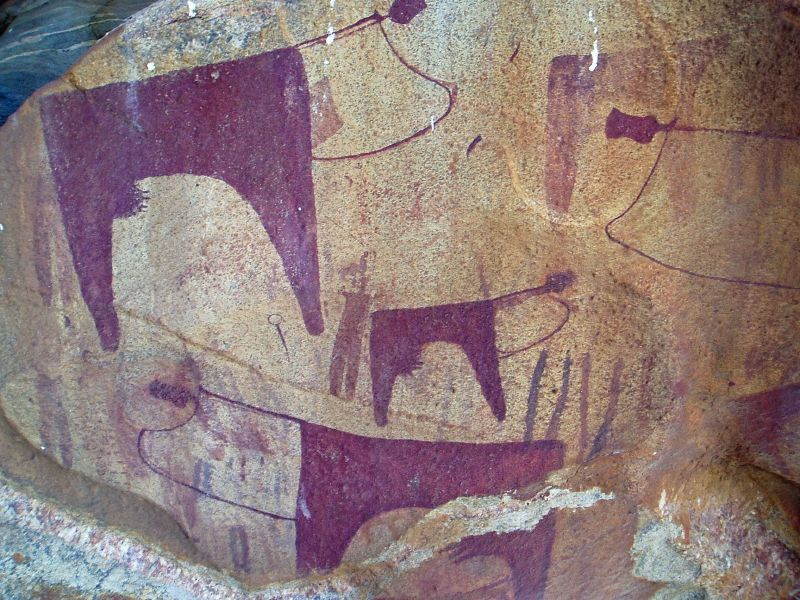
A herd of cows

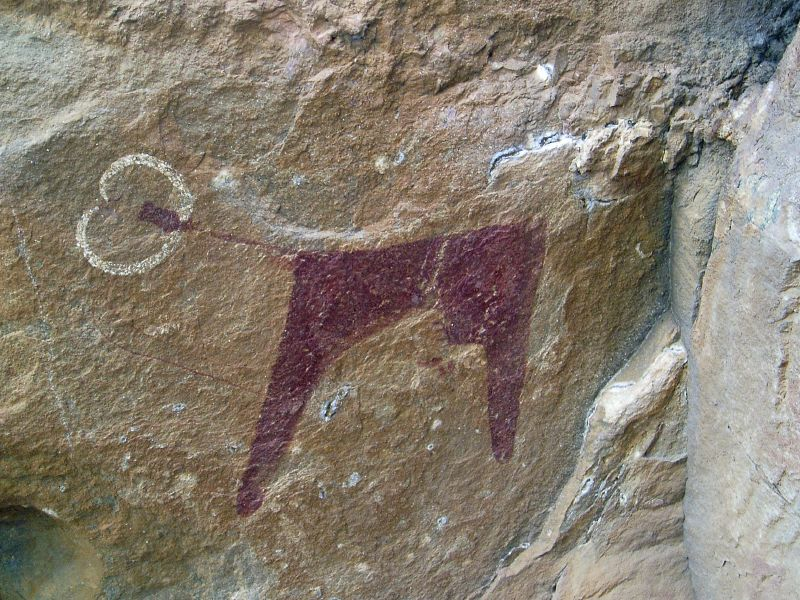
A single cow

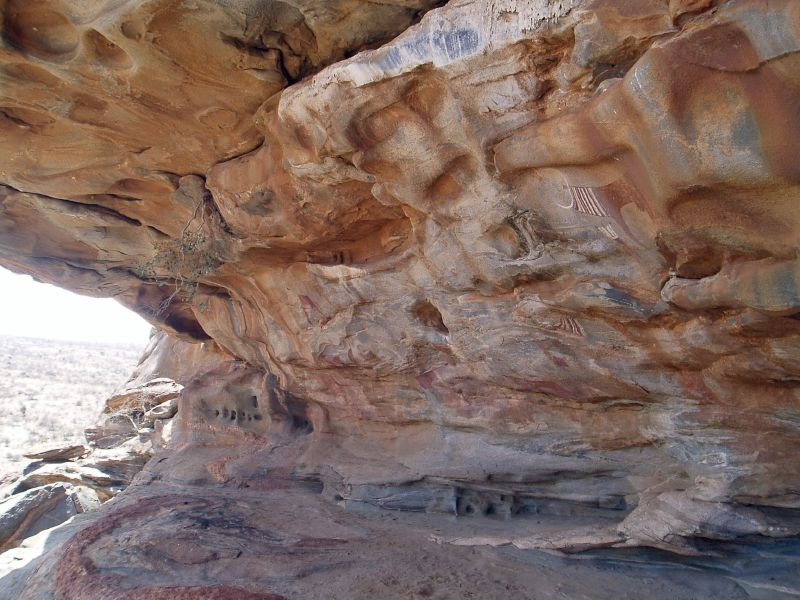
One of the alcoves at Laas Geel

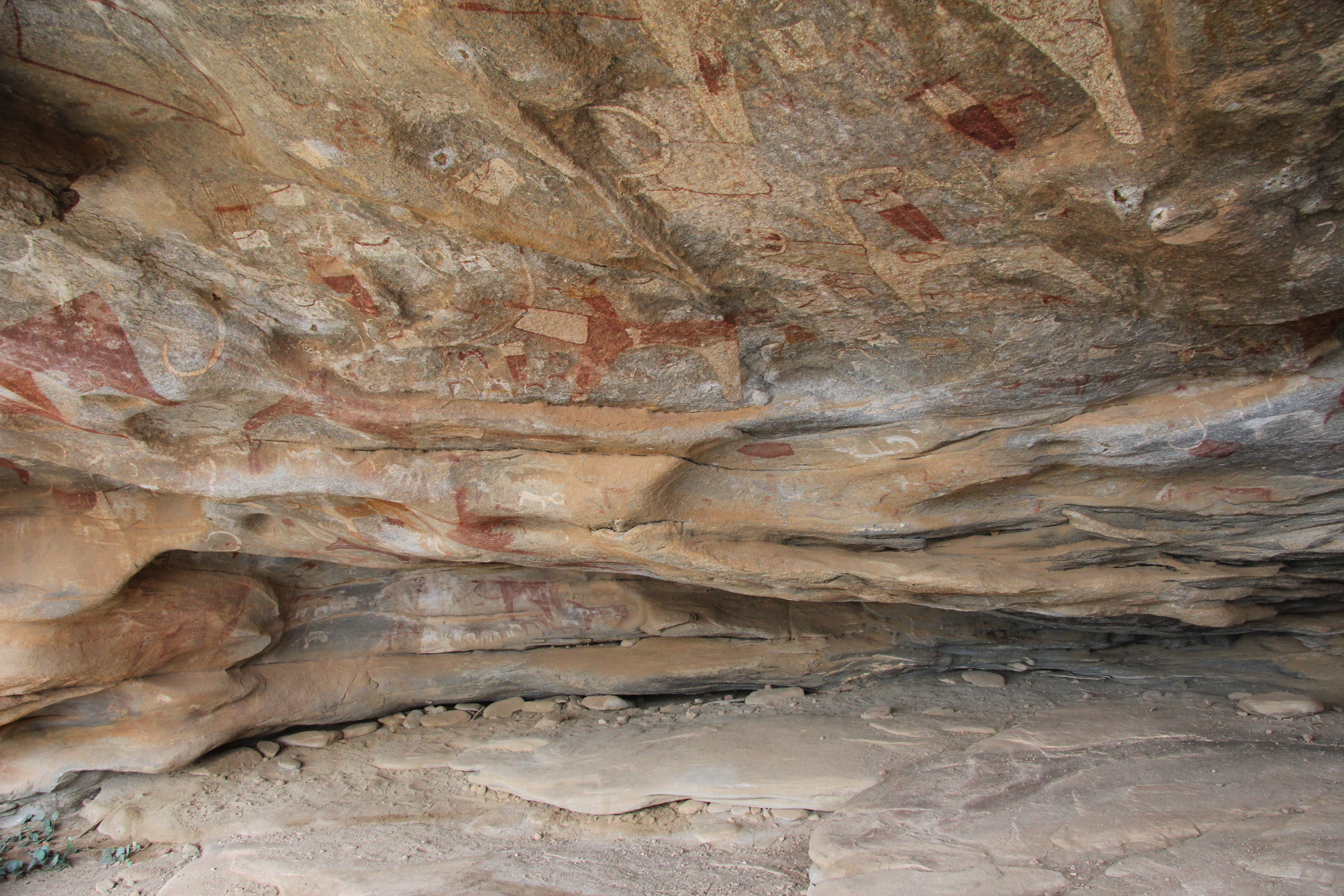
Various rock art

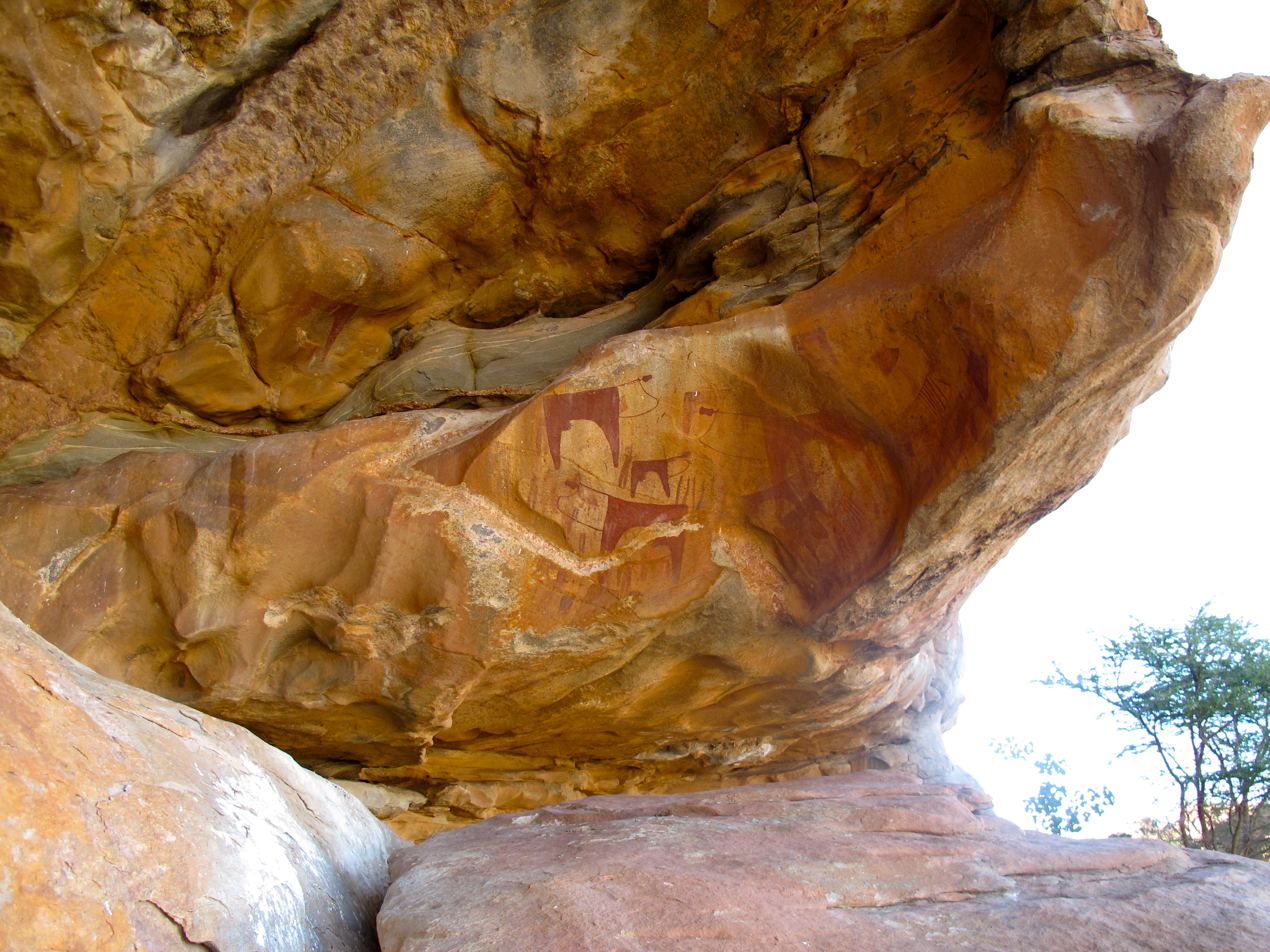
Various other rock art

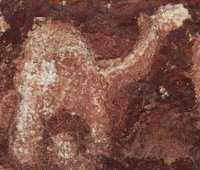
A camel

The word laas geel consist of two words according to Somali languages which is laas and geel, the word laas means well and the word geel means camel in Somali. Well refers to a source of water which camels and other livestock drink from as well as the people.

== See also ==
- Caves in Somaliland
- Dhambalin
- Dhaymoole
- History of Somaliland
