= Serranía de la Lindosa =

Rock art site in Colombia

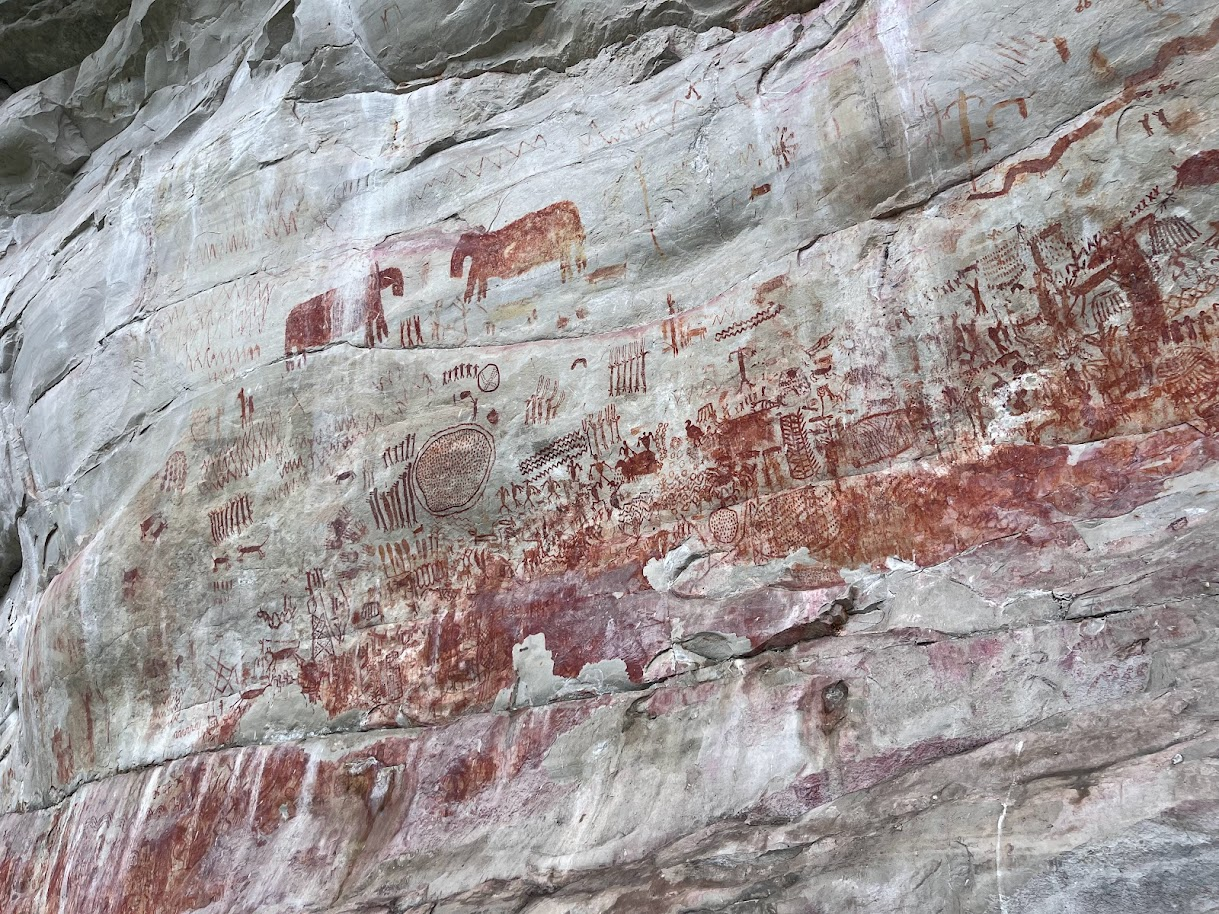
- Interactive map of Serranía de la Lindosa
- 2°28′49″N 72°44′43″W
- Periods: Contested, see text
- Location: Serranía de la Lindosa, Guaviare Department, Colombia
- Region: Amazon rainforest

History
- Abandoned: Yes

Site notes
- Length: About 13 km (8 mi)
- Archaeologists: Ella Al-Shamahi
- Discovered: 19th century
- Owner: Government of Colombia
- Public access: Limited

The Serranía de la Lindosa is a 13 km (8 mi) stretch of cliff in Colombia covered with tens of thousands of painted rock art images.

== Discovery ==
The rock art was first recorded in the 19th century by Agustin Codazzi, who was mapping the region. It was also recorded by Richard Evans Schultes in 1943. The first photographs were taken in the 1980s. Some sources erroneously suggest that the site was only recently discovered when it was publicized in the 2020s.

== Dating ==
The murals have not been directly dated. Some authors have suggested that they date to around 12,600 years ago, based on dating of sediment layers containing ochre flakes within excavations near the art, but others suggest that they are too well preserved to be so old. Local interpretative guides at the Cerro Azul site within Serranía De La Lindosa have said that the ochre paste was mixed with tree saps to aid in its preservation. It has been alternatively proposed that the art was made in the last 500 years by indigenous peoples after the initial European discovery of the Americas.

== Murals ==
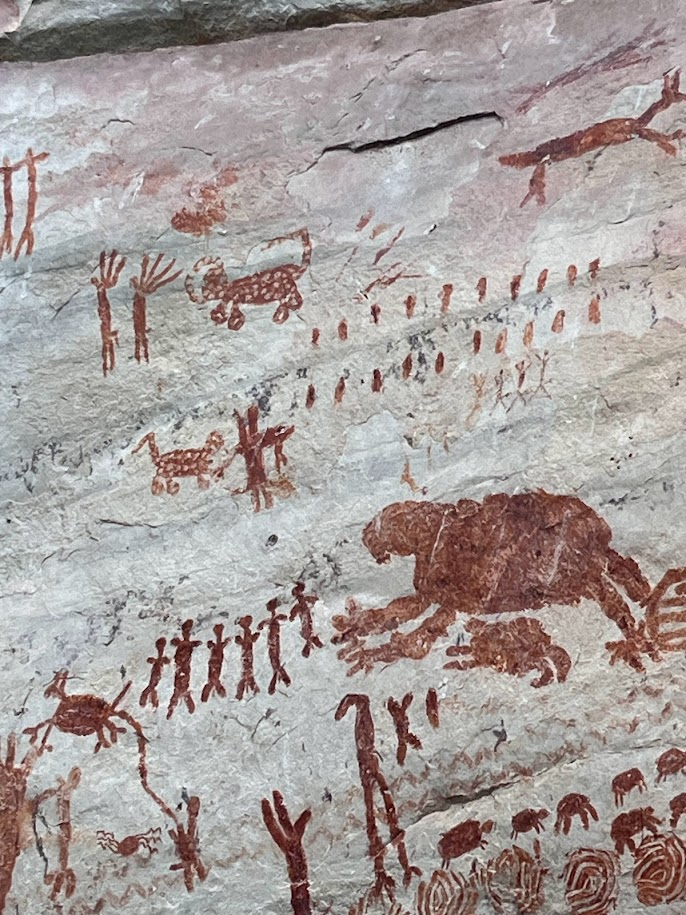
Photo of a section of the rockface with depictions of various animals and human figures

The murals were painted with yellow and red ochre. Some paintings at the Cerro Azul and Nuevo Tolima sites show figures climbing ladders or palm trees, indicating how they were able to reach the high upper painted walls. Some authors claim that the art depicts now-extinct South American megafauna, such as ground sloths, gomphotheres, native equines (Hippidion) and macraucheniids; others argue that they likely represent living animals, including domestic species introduced in the Columbian exchange like horses and cows, leading to a younger age estimate.
