= Dhambalin =

Archaeological site in the northwestern Togdheer province of Somaliland

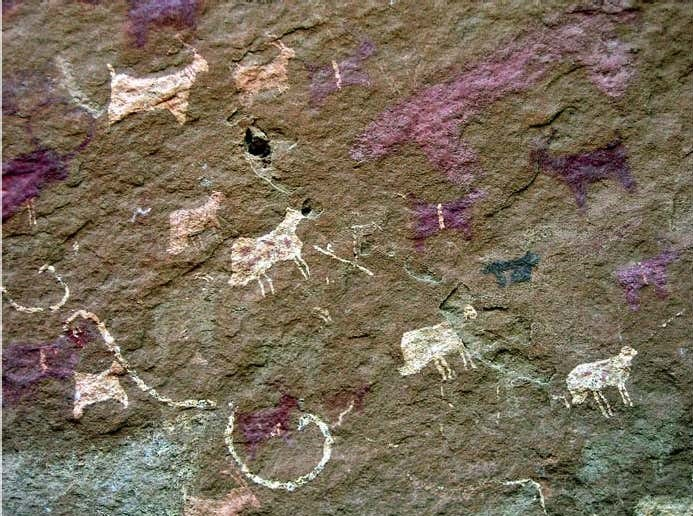
- Snakes, sheep and goat polychrome with symbolic elements and other rock art in the cave complex

- Location within Sahil, Somaliland Location within Somaliland
- Location: Dhambalin, Sahil, Somaliland
- Coordinates: 10.399768°N 45.900335°E
- Access: Public

Dhambalin ("half, vertically cut mountain") is an archaeological site in the central Sahil province of Somaliland. The sandstone rock shelter contains rock art depicting various animals such as horned cattle and goats, as well as giraffes, an animal no longer found in the country. The site also features the earliest known pictures of sheep in Somaliland. Discovered in autumn 2007, residents of Beenyo Dhaadheer reported the rock art to the Somali archaeologist Sada Mire, Director of the Department of Archaeology within the Ministry of Tourism and Culture of Somaliland.

The archaeological site is dated to about 5000 years ago. The images provide an important link to the rock art of the Horn of Africa, particularly in their representation of its pastoral cultures and fauna.

The site is endangered because of a lack of adequate security arrangements. Though the archaeological study has been done with funding by the UN, the site's recognition as UNESCO World Heritage Site is not feasible at this stage as Somaliland is not recognized as an independent nation, and also not ratified the 1972 World Heritage Convention.

== Geography ==
It is situated approximately 40 miles (64 km) from the Red Sea. The nearest town is Beenyo Dhaadheer, a small rural village about 60 kilometers east of the port city of Berbera. The lower part of the sandstone shelter rock is covered by sand. The sandstone is fragile and affected by corrosion. Due to wind erosion and porosity, portions of the rock fragments are broken off while paintings are visible on the remaining ruins.

== Features ==
"We all agree that this is an important discovery." (Lazare Eloundou Assomo, Chief of Africa, UNESCO World Heritage Centre, 2011)

—

The multi-layered paintings cover an area of approximately 4 by 12 metres (13 ft × 39 ft). They are of the Ethiopian-Arabic style, and dates to 5000–3000 BP. Similarities are noted with the rock art in Jilib Rihin and Haadh that were found in the Togdheer region by Sada Mire also in 2007. The polychrome paintings of the Neolithic or proto-historic Arabian–Ethiopian Style, depict the first sheep paintings in Somali archaeology and also many of antelopes, dogs, giraffes, snakes and a turtle with and also without humans. There are eight to ten people represented, usually as part of hunting scenes, with bow and arrow; they are surrounded by wildlife. One of the hunters is depicted with hair down and with headgear, accompanied by two dogs. Another hunter sits on an animal, possibly a horse; the depiction of humans riding the animals with raised hands is interpreted to mean worshipping the cattle. Two human figures are clearly male and have their arms outstretched. A humanoid figure is painted in white with a large head compared to the body; possibly a child. Compared to animals, people are painted less lifelike.

Most of the animals are shown in profile. Of the wildlife, there are at least eight giraffes (which are now extinct in Somaliland) in different colors, a turtle, antelopes, lions, snakes, baboon-like animal and a wild cat. Fourteen sheep are clearly identifiable with a typical shape, head, nose and thin legs. Three of them are painted in red with a white belt around the waist, while the remaining eleven are white with red decorative elements. In contrast to sheep found in Somaliland today, they do not have black heads. Cattle are in different colors and sizes, but usually depicted as cows with full udders and sometimes accompanied by calves and also some without humps and headless. Several bulls and at least five goats are shown. Other conspicuous bands drawn on the backs and bellies of cows attest to the farming traditions of the people.

== Gallery ==
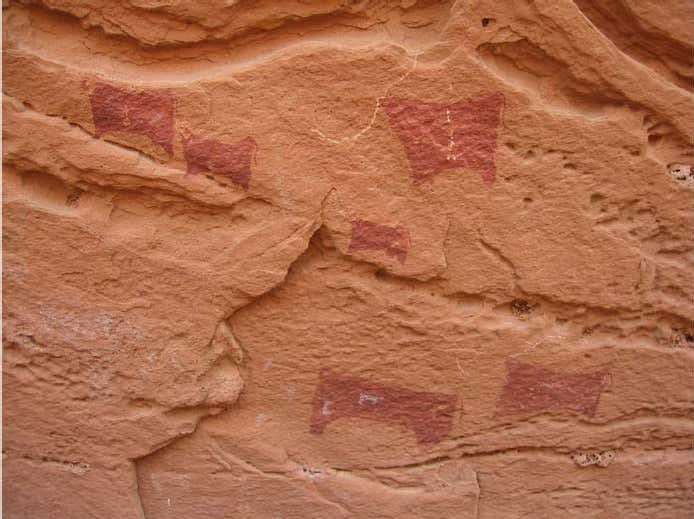
Polychrome paintings of bovines including headless ones

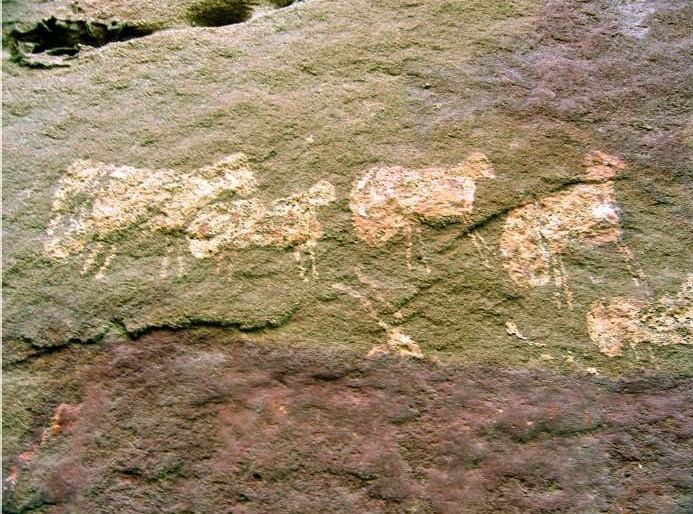
First sheep depictions in Somali archaeology at Dhambalin

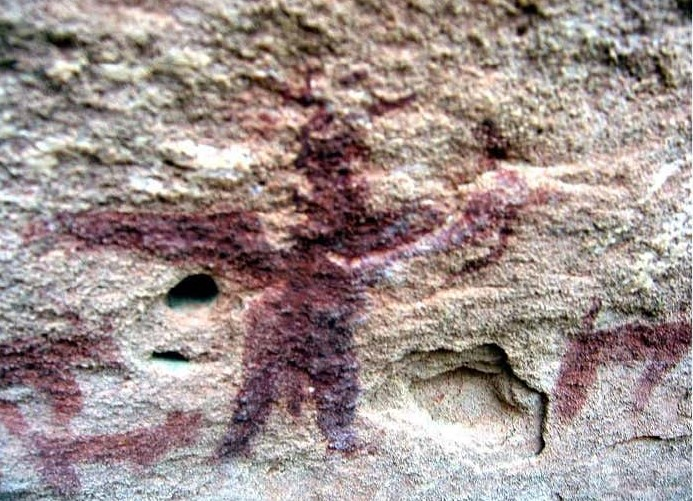
Human figure wearing headgear and carrying bow and arrow, hunting with dogs

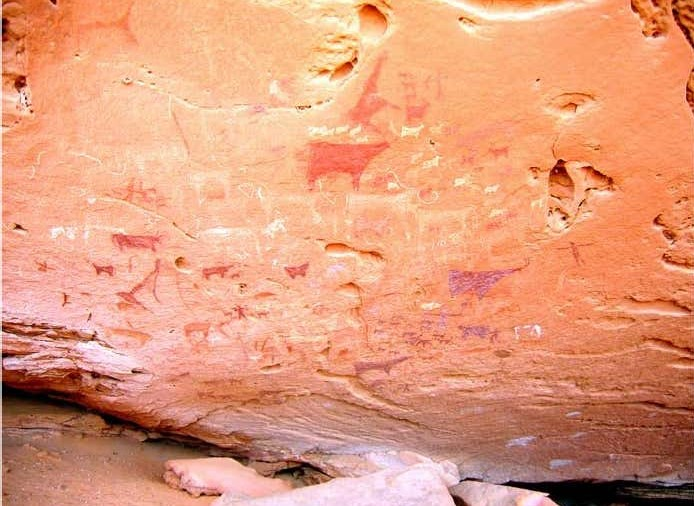
The great panel of Dhambalin

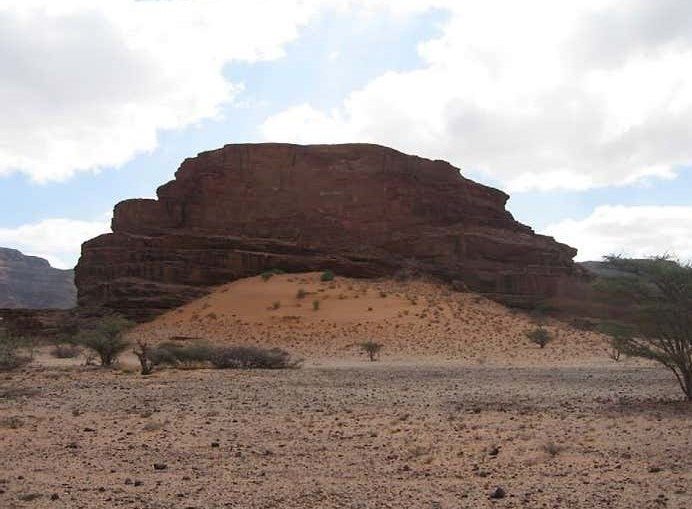
The Dhambalin sandstone rock shelter

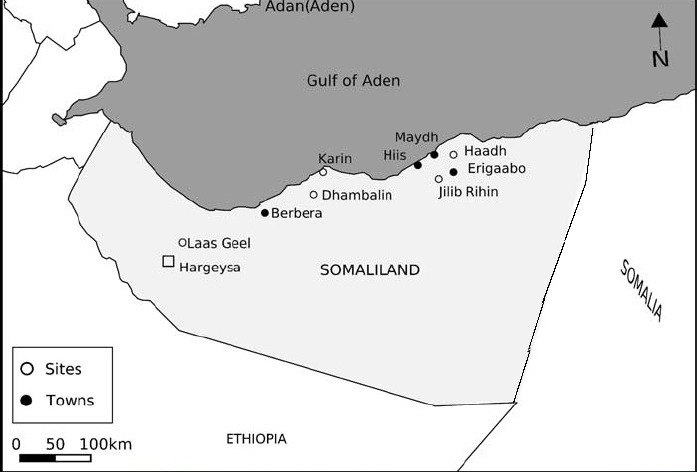
Location of Dhambalin in Somaliland

== See also ==
- Caves in Somaliland
- Laas Geel
- Dhaymoole
- History of Somaliland
