= Dhaymoole =

Archaeological site in Sahil, Somaliland

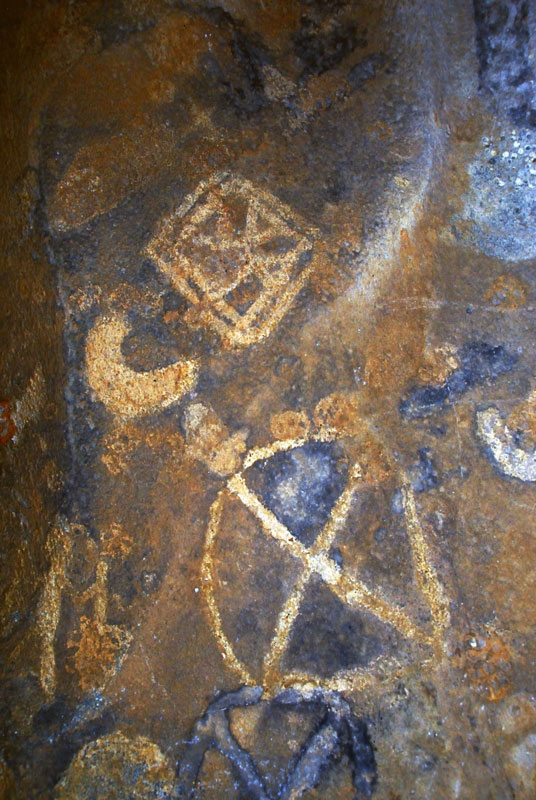
- Painted rock art on a rock face.

- Location within Sahil, Somaliland Location within Somaliland
- Location: Dhaymoole mountain, Sahil, Somaliland
- Coordinates: 10.1147808°N 45.039771°E
- Discovery: 2013
- Access: Public

Dhaymoole is an archaeological site in the Sahil province of Somaliland. The site is a cave that contains a collection of ancient rock drawings depicting a variety of animals as well as some unidentified symbols. These drawings were created during the third millennium BC.

== Petroglyphs ==
The walls of the cave are full of infilled and outlined white camels, unidentified quadrupeds, circles, and symbols. Most of the quadrupeds are schematic and depicted upright, facing to the right. The Caves of Dhaymoole are believed to be about 3000 to 5000 years old.

The cave also depicts the place of sunset and sunrise, with the Sun on one side and the moon on the other side. It also depicts a camel, giraffe, elephant and other wild animals, many of which have become extinct in the region.

== Gallery ==
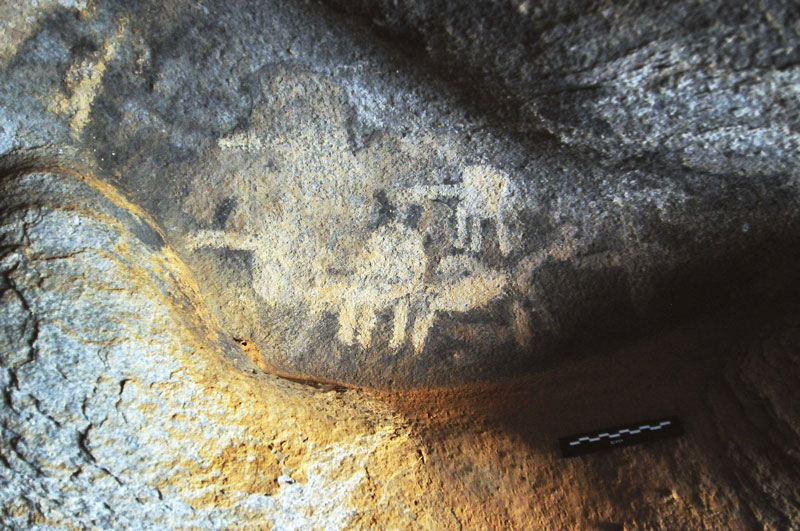

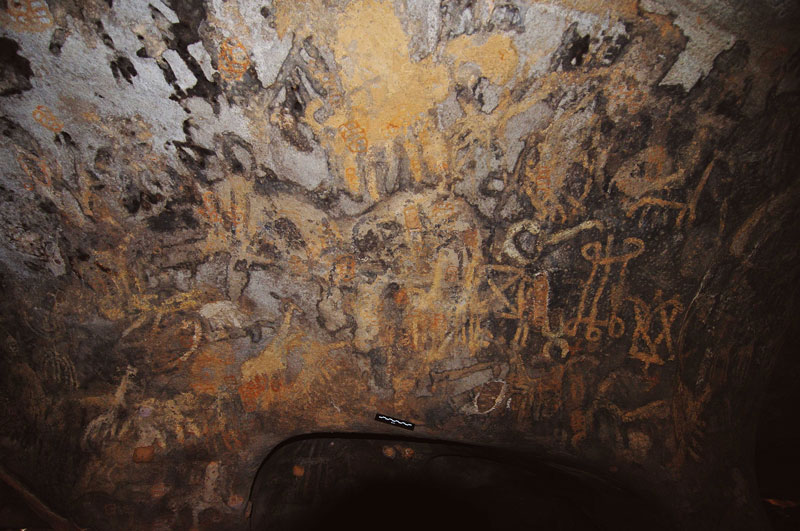

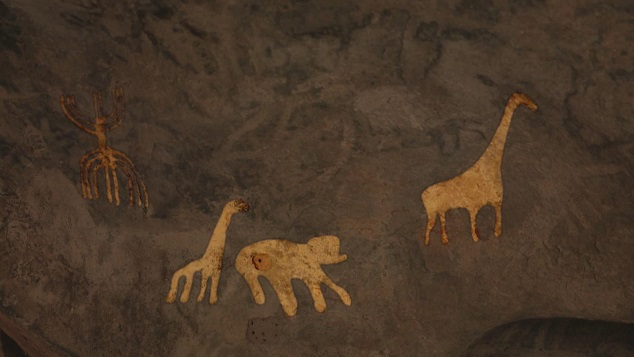

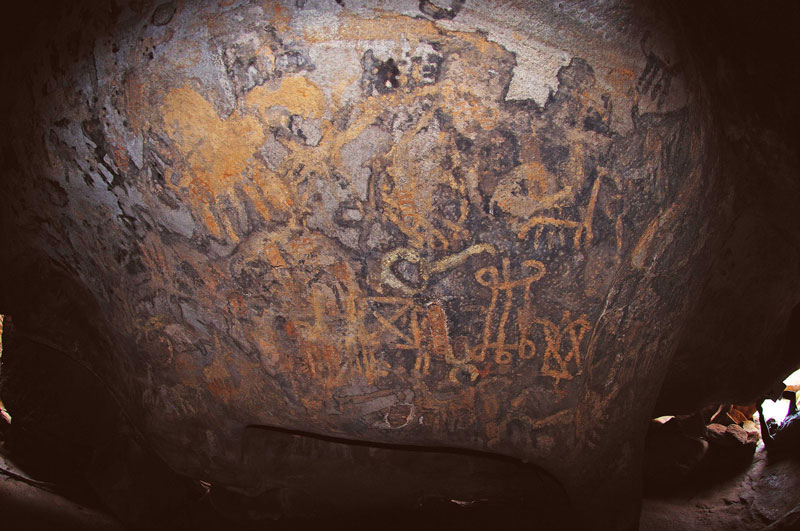

== See also ==
- Caves in Somaliland
- Laas Geel
- Dhambalin
- History of Somaliland
