= Janine Mountain =

Mountain in Saudi Arabia

Highest point
- Coordinates: 27.56466°N 42.30275°E

Geography
- Location: Ha'il, Saudi Arabia

Geology
- Rock age: 6000 - 4000 years ago

Janine Mountain is located in the Ha'il region in the middle of Lake Janine, which is rich in groundwater and has a large cave about 100 meters long. There are many ancient Thamudic and Abyssinian inscriptions scattered on the rocks of the mountain, in addition to a large collection of human and animal writings and drawings. Janine is located about 75 km east of Ha'il.

== Overview ==
Janine Mountain and Cave is located 75 kilometers northeast of Ha'il province. The mountain is considered one of the tourist sites in the region, because it includes one of the oldest archaeological prehistoric caves in which humans settled before the Ha'il region, It also features a collection of rock paintings and rock carvings that are expressive in their themes, compositions, and elements. On the walls of its cave, tourists can see a variety of paintings and engravings that have been carved using various artistic methods, including intaglio, relief, slitting, and hollowing. Passing through successive historical eras until before Christ, the mountain's inscriptions and drawings represent the activities of prehistoric man and images of his daily life. The cave includes ancient Thamudic writings and various human and animal drawings.

== Archaeological value ==
Archaeological evidence is scattered in the 3-kilometer-long Janine Mountain off the Great Nafud Desert, although archaeological explorations of the site did not reveal a residential settlement, however, the dry lake and the buried wells in the northeastern parts of the site confirm that a settlement once existed nearby, which may have been buried by the Nafud sands that cover much of the site. In the light of scientific studies, it is concluded that the site of Janine was inhabited during the fourth millennium BC. This idea is supported by laboratory studies of some of the site's petroglyphs, the results of the analysis of the antler layer taken from the surface of the caribou drawing indicated that it was dated between 6,000 and 4,000 years before present. The presence of several ancient northern Arabic inscriptions (Thamudic) at the Janine site also leads to a conclusion that Janine was heavily settled during the period when the Thamudic line spread in the region, which is during the second half of the first millennium BC. The ruins of the Janine site are based on two archaeological themes:

- A group of petroglyphs found painted on the rocks of Janine Mountain, embody those commonly seen themes in North Arabia's rock paintings, which mostly contain human and animal figures such as cows, ibexes, camels, horses, and some species of dogs. Also, a set of geometric shapes was revealed near a natural rock shelter about 100 meters east of Janine Mountain, which came in the form of circles, semicircles, and perpendicular lines. Among the petroglyphs at the site are those uncovered in the Janine Cave, which portrays some of the social and religious life of the region's inhabitants during the first millennium BC. On the sides of the cave, a row of human figures with animal heads, drawn in a sketchy style, appear to be in motion, as if the artist wanted to show them dancing, in addition to these drawings, there are drawings of perhaps two women whose heads are depicted as an animal head like a horse or donkey, they are dressed below the knee and it is not clear from their details whether they are made of leather or cloth, the details suggests a skill in cutting and Knitting. In addition, the cave contains repeated prints of hands, that can indicate an intellectual significance associated with religious doctrines in the ancient world. The handprints in the Janine Cave appear to date from the second half of the first century BC. This opinion is supported by some framed paintings accompanied by some Thamudic inscriptions dating back to the second half of the first century BC.
- The second theme that captures some of the cultural life of the site's inhabitants at the time, on the surrounding rock faces, a series of inscriptions written in the ancient northern Arabic script (Thamudic) contains the names of the inhabitants of the region at that time, one of which mentions a tribe called (Sabah). The inscriptions on the site are generally of the memorial type, which only mentions the names of people, some of their feelings and emotions towards their families and loved ones, and some of their prayers directed to their gods to ask for help and contentment.

== See also ==
- List of mountains in Saudi Arabia
