= Savva =

Savva (Greek: Σάββα, romanized: Sávva, Russian: Савва) is a name of Greek origin derived from Aramaic סָבָא sāḇā meaning 'wise'

Variant forms or transliterations include Sabas, Sabbas, Savas, Savvas, Saba, Sava, Savo and Sawa.

The name can also be used as a surname (also Greek surnames Savas and Savvas) and it gave rise to a number of patronymic surnames, including Savković/Savkovich/Savkovych/Sawkowicz, Savukynas, Savkov (ru:Савков), Savkin (ru:Савкин), Savukov, Savin, Savinykh, Savchenko, Savenko Savchuk/Sawczuk, Savvin, Savka (Савка), Sawka, Savich/Sawicz/Savić/Савић, Savvich (ru:Саввич), Savichev, Savvichev (ru:Саввичев), Savinsky, Savvinsky, Savvides, Savvidis, Savvidi,

Notable people with the name include:

== Given name ==
- Savva Chevakinsky (1709 – after 1774), Russian architect
- Savva Georgiou (1933–1992), Cypriot football striker
- Savva Fomichenko
- Savva Kulish (1936–2001), Soviet film director and screenwriter
- Savva Lika (born 1970), Greek javelin thrower
- Savva Mamontov (1841–1918), Russian industrialist, merchant, entrepreneur, and patron of the arts
- Savva Timofeyevich Morozov (1862–1905), Russian businessman and philanthropist
- Savva Vasilyevich Morozov (1770 – 1860), Russian entrepreneur, who founded the Morozov dynasty
- Savva Novikov
- Savva Vetokhin
- Savva Yamshchikov (1938–2009), a leading expert on Russian provincial art
- Savva Yakovlev (1713–1784), Russian entrepreneur, industrialist, philanthropist, and one of the Russian richest people of his time

== Surname ==
- Amber Savva (born 1993), British actress
- Anna Savva, British actress
- Nick Savva (born 1934), British greyhound trainer
- Niki Savva, Cypriot-born Australian journalist, author
- Savvas Savva (born 1958), Cypriot composer, musicologist and pianist

== See also ==
- Savva (village) village in Mordovia, Russia
- Sabbas
- Sava (name)
- Savvas (disambiguation)
