= Selvin =

Selvin may refer to:

== People ==
=== Given name ===
- Selvin Christopher, Indian aerospace engineer
- Selvin González (1981–2006), Salvadoran footballer
- Selvin Laínez (born 1983), Honduran politician
- Selvin Pennant (born 1950), Guatemalan footballer
- Selvin Young (born 1983), American football player
- Selvin Zelaya (born 1979), Salvadoran footballer
- Selvin Zepeda (born 1981), Salvadoran footballer

=== Surname ===
- Ben Selvin (1898–1980), American musician and bandleader
- Elizabeth Selvin (born 1977), American diabetes epidemiologist
- Joel Selvin (born 1950), American music critic and author
- Lowell Selvin (born 1959), American business executive
- Nancy Selvin (born 1943), American sculptor
- Paul R. Selvin, American physicist
- Steve Selvin (born 1941), American statistician

== Other uses ==
- Selvin, Indiana, US
- Paul Selvin Award, given by the Writers Guild of America
