= Saba =

Saba may refer to:

== Places ==
- Saba (island), an island of the Netherlands located in the Caribbean Sea
- Sabá, a municipality in the department of Colón, Honduras
- Șaba or Șaba-Târg, the Romanian name for Shabo, a village in Ukraine
- Saba, Iran, a village in Bushehr Province
- Saba District, Yamaguchi, formerly located in Yamaguchi Prefecture, Japan
- Saba (Luga), a river in Leningrad Oblast, Russia
- Saba River (Japan), a river in Yamaguchi Prefecture, Japan
- Saba (Kazkash), a tributary of the Kazkash in Sabinsky District, Tatarstan, Russia
- Saba Island (United States Virgin Islands), an island three miles south of St. Thomas
- Saba Bank, the largest submarine atoll in the Atlantic Ocean, located in the Caribbean Netherlands
- Saba Rock, a small island in the British Virgin Islands
- Mukim Saba, a mukim in Brunei
- Kfar Saba, a city in Israel
- Kafr Saba, a historical village in Mandatory Palestine

== History ==
- Saba', an ancient kingdom in South Arabia mentioned in Biblical and Islamic traditions

== People ==
- Saba (given name), includes a list of people with the name
- Saba (surname), includes a list of people with the name
- Saba or Sabbas the Goth (334–372), Christian saint
- Saba or Sabbas the Sanctified (439–532), Christian saint
- Saba (Esber) (born 1959), Antiochian Orthodox Metropolitan over the Archdiocese of New York and All North America
- Saba (rapper) (born 1994), American rapper and record producer
- Saba (singer) (born 1997), Danish singer

== Organizations ==
- Saba & Co. IP, an intellectual property firm active in Middle East and Africa
- SABA (electronics manufacturer), German electronics company and jazz record label, became MPS Records
- Saba TV Network, an Afghan satellite television networking two channels
- Saba of California, a California clothing brand
- SABA (clothing), an up-market clothing brand sold in Australia
- Saba (car), an Iranian car model based on the Kia Motors Pride design
- SABA (hygiene products), Norwegian hygiene products company, became Essity
- Saba Capital Management, American hedge fund managed by Boaz Weinstein
- Saba Petroleum, a private U.S. oil and gas company, mainly operating in southern and central California
- Saba News Agency, official Yemeni government news agency
- Saba University School of Medicine, located on the island of Saba, Netherlands
- Sacramento Area Bicycle Advocates (SABA), a bicycle advocacy organization in Sacramento, California
- SABA Women's Championship, a basketball tournament organized by the South Asia Basketball Association

== Plants ==
- Saba banana, a variety of banana originating in the Philippines
- Saba (plant), a genus in family Apocynaceae native to Africa and Indian Ocean islands
- Saba nut, the name of two species in the family Malvaceae native to Central and South America:
  - Pachira aquatica
  - Pachira glabra

== Other uses ==
- British Aerospace P.1233-1 Saba, a proposed military aircraft
- "Saba", a ska song by Mephiskapheles
- Saba, the Japanese term for mackerel
- SABA, Short-acting β-agonist, a class of drug primarily used to treat asthma and other pulmonary disorders
- Saba (1929 film), a Soviet silent drama film
- Saba (2024 film), a Bengali-language film
- Saba (condiment), a typical condiment used in parts of Italy
- Saba (music), a scale in Arabic and Turkish music
- Saba (sura), a chapter of the Qur'an
- Saba (wind), an east wind that blows in the west of the Arabian peninsula
- Saba language, an Afroasiatic language of Chad
- Saba Saba Day, a remembrance day in Tanzania and Kenya
- Saba Sebatyne, a New Order Jedi character in the Star Wars Expanded Universe
- "Saba the Bird", a poem by Patti Smith from the 1978 book Babel
- Sabba, a fictional character in the 2023 Indian film Pathaan

== See also ==
- Sabah (disambiguation)
- Sabha (disambiguation)
- Sabbas (disambiguation)
- Sheba (disambiguation)
- Sabian (disambiguation), a religious group mentioned in the Quran
- Sabean (disambiguation)
