= Shabash =

Shabash (Shabhash, Sabash, Sabaash or Shavash), a term used in the Indian subcontinent to signal commendation for an achievement, similar in meaning to bravo and kudos, may refer to:

- Sabhash, a 2000 Indian Tamil-language film
- Shabash (album), a 1991 album by Alisa

== See also ==
- Savas (disambiguation)
- Sabas, a male given name
- Sabbas, a male given name
