= Savvin =

Savvin (Russian: Саввин) is a Russian masculine surname, its feminine counterpart is Savvina. It may refer to

- Iya Savvina (1936–2011), Russian film actress
- Roman Savvin (born 1972), Russian football player
- Sergei Savvin (born 1987), Russian football player
- Vasily Savvin (1939–2020), Soviet and Russian military leader

== See also ==
- Savin (name)
- Savina (name)
