= Savvas =

Savvas may refer to:

- Savvas (given name), a given name from Greek
- Savvas (surname), a surname from Greek
- Ayios Savvas, a neighborhood and parish of Nicosia, Cyprus
- Savvas Learning Company, a K-12 educational publishing company

== See also ==
- Sabbas, a name
- Savas (disambiguation)
- Savva (disambiguation)
