= Saba (surname) =

Saba is the surname of the following notable people:

- Abdullah ibn Saba', 7th-century Islamic figure associated with the group called the Sabaʾiyya
- Abraham Saba (1440–1508), Spanish rabbi
- Abolhasan Saba (1902–1957), Iranian composer and teacher of Persian traditional music
- Ahmad Saba'a (born 1980), Arab-Israeli footballer
- Bassam Saba (1958–2020), Lebanese musician
- Christian Saba (born 1978), Ghanaian footballer
- Daud Shah Saba (born 1964), Afghan politician
- Dia Saba (born 1992), Israeli footballer, cousin of Ahmad Saba'a
- Elias Saba (1932–2023), Lebanese politician and economist
- Emilio Saba (born 2001), Peruvian footballer
- Fakhereh Saba (1920–2007), the first female opera singer in Iran
- Fuad Saba (1902–1984), Palestinian businessman and politician
- Geoffrey Saba (born 1946), Australian classical pianist of Lebanese descent
- Gian Franco Saba (born 1968), Italian Roman Catholic Archbishop of Sassari
- Gustavo Saba (born 1979), Paraguayan rally driver
- Hussain Taher Al Saba (born 1979), Saudi Arabian long jumper
- Isak Saba (1875–1921), Sami teacher and politician
- Joe Saba (born 1940), Australian fashion designer of Lebanese descent
- Joseph Saba (composer) (born 1971), American composer
- Juan Carlos Oblitas Saba (born 1951), Peruvian footballer
- Moisés Saba (1963–2010), Mexican business tycoon
- Nathalie Saba (born 1998), Egyptian-Lebanese singer
- Nicole Saba (born 1974), Lebanese singer and actress
- Pierre-Macario Saba (1873–1943), Archbishop of the Melkite Greek Catholic Archeparchy of Aleppo
- Shōichi Saba (1919–2012), one of the pioneers of postwar Japanese manufacturing
- Sohana Saba (born 1986), Bangladeshi television and film actress
- Steeven Saba (born 1993), Haitian football midfielder
- Timoria McQueen Saba, American politician
- Umberto Saba (1883–1957), Italian poet and novelist
- Vítor Saba (born 1990), Brazilian footballer

== See also ==
- Sabas
- Sabbas
