= Savio =

Savio may refer to:

== People ==
Surname

- Carlos Fernando Savio (born 1978), Uruguayan footballer
- Daniel Savio (born 1978), Swedish musician
- Dominic Savio (1842–1857), Italian saint
- Edit Romanos Cristovão Savio (born 1992), Timorese footballer
- Ernesto Savio (1899–1945), Italian partisan
- Gaetano Savio (1937–2004), better known as Totò Savio, Italian composer, lyricist, producer and guitarist
- Gianni Savio (1948–2024), Italian cycling manager
- Isaías Sávio (1902–1977), Uruguayan classical guitarist, composer, and music educator
- John Savio (1902–1938), Saami artist from Norway
- José Carlos dos Anjos Sávio (born 1985), Brazilian footballer
- Kathleen Savio (1963 - 2004), American homicide victim
- Manuel Savio (1893–1948), pioneer of Argentine metallurgy and heavy industry
- María Teresa Linares Savio (1920–2021), Cuban musicologist and ethnographer
- Mario Savio (1942–1996), Free Speech Movement leader at the University of California, Berkeley in the 1960s
- Matheus Gonçalves Sávio (born 1997), Brazilian footballer who plays as an attacking midfielder
- Roberto Savio founder of IPS
- Sami Savio, Finnish politician
- Vincenzo Savio (1944–2004), Italian Roman Catholic Bishop of Belluno-Feltre

Given name

- Sávio (footballer, born 1974) commonly known as Sávio, retired Brazilian footballer, of Flamengo and Real Madrid fame
- Sávio (footballer, born 1996) (Sávio Alves Marchiote), Brazilian right back
- Sávio (footballer, born 1995) (Sávio Antônio Alves), Brazilian left back
- Savio Kabugo (born 1995), Ugandan footballer
- Savio Medeira (born 1965), Indian footballer and manager
- Sávio (footballer, born 2004) (Sávio Moreira de Oliveira), Brazilian forward
- Savio Nsereko (born 1989), German footballer
- Sávio (footballer, born 1984) (Sávio Oliveira do Vale), Brazilian footballer
- Sávio Sousa (born 1977), Brazilian footballer
- Savio Tai Fai Hon (born 1950), Hong Kong-born Roman Catholic archbishop
- Savio Vega (born 1964), Puerto Rican professional wrestler

== Places ==
- Savio (river), an Italian river
- Savio, city district in Kerava, Finland
- Savio railway station, a railway station located in Savio, Kerava, Finland
- Savio, Laukaa, village in Finland
- Savio, a settlement in Escobar Partido, Argentina
- Savio (Ravenna), a frazione of Ravenna, Italy

== Other uses ==
- Deportes Savio, a Honduran football club
- Savio (office), a high office in the administration of the dogal Republic of Venice
