= Sava (disambiguation) =

The Sava is a river in central Europe.

Sava may also refer to:

== People ==
- Sava (name), a south Slavic name
- Sava the Goth (334–372), Romanian martyr and saint
- Saint Sava (1169/1174–1236), Serbian medieval prince turned monk and archbishop

== Places ==
=== Bulgaria ===
- Sava, Bulgaria, a village in Dalgopol

=== Estonia ===
- Sava, Estonia, village in Luunja Parish, Tartu County

=== Iran ===
- Sava, Iran, a city in Markazi Province

=== Italy ===
- Sava, Apulia, a commune in the province of Taranto, Apulia
- Sava (Baronissi), a village in the province of Salerno, Campania

=== Madagascar ===
- Sava Region

=== Mauritania ===
- Sava, Mauritania, a village

=== Romania ===
- Sava, Pălatca, a village in Pălatca Commune, Cluj County
- Sava River (Beznea), a tributary of the Beznea river

=== Serbia ===
- Lake Sava, a lake in Belgrade
- Sava Centar, an event facility in Belgrade
- Sava City, business district under construction in Belgrade

=== Slovenia ===
- Sava (Jesenice), a settlement that is now part of the town of Jesenice
- Sava, Litija, a settlement in the Municipality of Litija

== Organisations ==
- Sava (cycling team), a Slovenian cycling team
- Sava Tires, a Slovenian tire brand, part of the Goodyear Tire and Rubber Company

== Other uses ==
- Sava (mythology), a creature in Polynesian mythology
- Sava (insect), a genus of assassin bugs in the tribe Harpactorini
- Sava-class submarine, a class of Yugoslav submarines built during the late 1970s and early 1980s.
- Yugoslav submarine Sava, commissioned 1949, stricken 1971
- Yugoslav monitor Sava, formerly SMS Bodrog, the ship which fired the opening shots of the First World War

== See also ==
- SAVA (disambiguation)
- Savas (disambiguation)
- Sawa (disambiguation)
