= Bielyja Lauki =

Shopping arcade and monument

Coordinates: 52.5562°N 24.4558°E

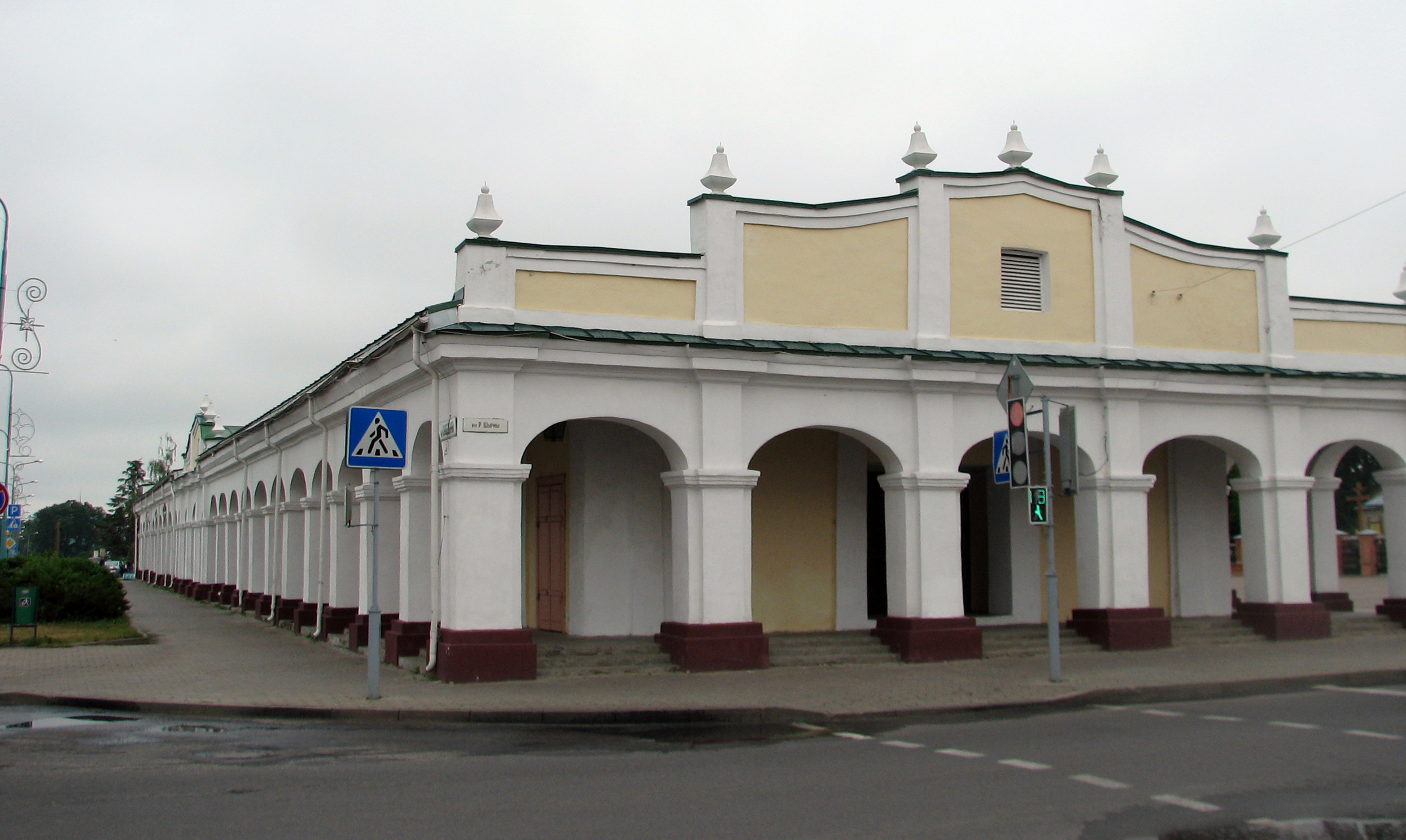
Bielyja Lauki

Bielyja Lauki (Belarusian: Белыя лаўкі) is a shopping arcade and now a monument to civic architecture of the 19th century in Pruzhany town, Brest Voblast (province), Western Belarus. It was constructed in 1867 by the architects Mikhailousky and Savich.

== History ==
The brick-built shopping arcade was constructed on the same place where the earlier wooden shopping arcade was located. The project was supported by the Grodno governorate architect Mikhailousky and diocesan architect Savich.

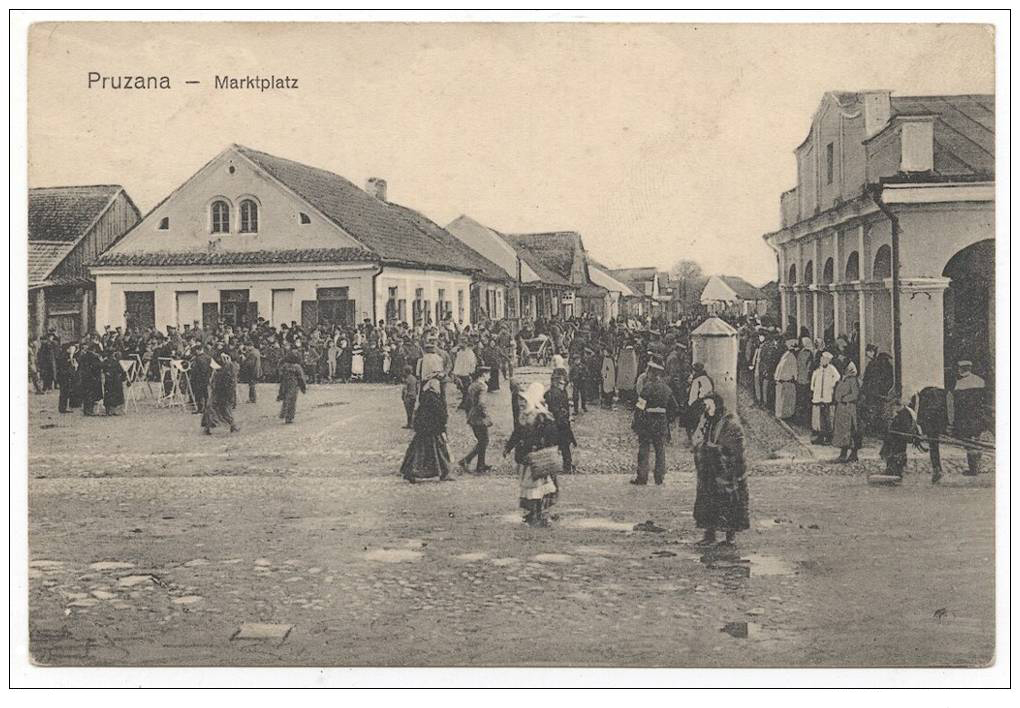
Market square and Bielyja Lauki (on the right) in Pruzhany. 1917

== Architecture ==
This market place is rare example of the 19th century civic monumental architecture with baroque and classicism.

It is a rectangular two-story building with gable roof and pointed pediment at abutting ends. It has two rows of merchant cells formed by massive arcades from two lengthwise faces. Shallow rectangular niches in walls contain doors and shop-windows and are opposite to intervals between arch pillars.

== Book sources ==
- Архітэктурныя помнікі Пружаншчыны (Architectural monuments of Pruzhany area) // Памяць: Гіст.-дакум. хроніка Пружан. р-на / Беларус. Энцыкл.; Рэдкал. І. П. Шамякін (гал. рэд.) і інш.; Маст. А. М. Хількевіч. — Мн.: БелЭн, 1992. ISBN 5-85700-094-7. — Page. 39.
- Свод памятников истории и культуры Белоруссии. Брестская область (List of Belarusian historical and cultural monuments. Brest region)// / Редкол.: С. В. Марцелев (гл. ред.) и др. — Мн.: БелСЭ, 1990. — 424 pages — ISBN 5-85700-017-3
