= Savvas (surname) =

Savvas (Greek: Σάββας) is a Greek surname. Notable people with the surname include:

- Alexander Savvas (1907–1981), Greek Professor of Medicine
- Dimitrios Savvas (born 1939), Greek Olympic wrestler
- Georgios Savvas (c. 1880s–?), Greek revolutionary chieftain
- Olivia Savvas, Australian politician

== See also ==
- Savas (disambiguation)
- Savvas (disambiguation)
- Sava (name)
