= Grozdev =

Grozdev (Bulgarian: Гроздев, from грозде meaning vine) is a Bulgarian masculine surname, its feminine counterpart is Grozdeva. It may refer to

- Maria Grozdeva (born 1972), Bulgarian sport shooter
- Sava Grozdev (born 1950), Bulgarian mathematician and educator
