= Savina =

Savina may refer to

Places

- Savina, Ljubno, a dispersed settlement in Slovenia
- Savina Ski Jumping Center in Slovenia
- Savina monastery (Serbia), cave monastery in southern Serbia
- Savina monastery (Montenegro)
- La Savina, a port village in eastern Spain
- Savina Museum in South Korea

Other

- Savina (name)
- Savina Caylyn, an oil tanker of the Italian shipping line Fratelli D'Amato
- Red Savina pepper, a chile pepper
