= Pruzhany (air base) =

Pruzhany
- Pruzhany, Brest Region in Belarus

Site information
- Type: Air Base
- Owner: Ministry of Defence
- Operator: Belarusian Air Force

Location
- Shown within Belarus
- Coordinates: 52°35′00″N 24°22′45″E

Site history
- Built: 1945
- In use: 1945 - 1993

Airfield information
- Elevation: 10 metres (33 ft) AMSL
Runways
Direction	Length and surface
15/33	2,500 metres (8,202 ft) Concrete

Pruzhany is a former airbase of the Belarusian Air Force located near Pruzhany, Brest Region, Belarus.

The base was home to the:

- 206th Independent Assault Aviation Regiment between 1984 and 1993 with the Sukhoi Su-25 (ASCC: Frogfoot) and the Aero L-39 Albatros
- 357th Independent Assault Aviation Regiment between 1984 and 1985 with the Su-25 and the L-39
- 330th Independent Helicopter Regiment between 1976 and 1987 with the Mil Mi-8 (ASCC: Hip) and the Mil Mi-24 (ASCC: Hind)
- 181st Independent Helicopter Regiment between 1988 and 1992 with the Mi-8 and Mi-24
- 953rd Assault Aviation Regiment between 1945 and 1946 with the Ilyushin Il-2 (ASCC: Bark)
- 225th Independent Helicopter Regiment between 1972 and 1977 with Mil Mi-4 (ASCC: Hound) and the Mi-8
- 163rd Guards Fighter Aviation Regiment between 1952 and 1961 with the Mikoyan-Gurevich MiG-15 (ASCC: Fagot) and the Mikoyan-Gurevich MiG-17 (ASCC: Fresco)
