= Savukynas =

- Lithuanian surname
- m.: Savukynas
- f.: (unmarried): Savukynaitė
- f.: (married): Savukynienė

Savukynas is a Lithuanian-language surname, from East Slavic patronymic surname Savukin, derived from the Belarusian given name Savuk, a diminutive of Savva.Notable people with the surname include:

- Bronys Savukynas (1930–2008), Lithuanian philologist, linguist, translator, journalist, editor
- Gintaras Savukynas (born 1971), professional Lithuanian handball player
- Virginijus Savukynas (born 1974) Lithuanian journalist, cultural anthropologist
