= Savković =

Savković (Serbian: Савковић, may also be transliterated as Savkovich) is a South Slavic patronymic surname derived from the given name Savko, a diminutive of Savva. Notable people with the surname include:

- Ernst Savkovic (born 1953), German football player
- Mile Savković (born 1992), Serbian football player
- Robert Savković (born 1978), Croatian handball player

== See also ==
- Savković, Ljubovija, a village in Serbia
- google search in Serbian Wikipedia
