= Sabian =

Sabian may refer to:

- Sabians, name of a religious group mentioned in the Quran, historically adopted by:
  - Mandaeans, Gnostic sect from the marshlands of southern Iraq claiming John the Baptist as their most important prophet
  - Sabians of Harran, astral religion from Harran (Upper Mesopotamia) associated with Hermeticism and other forms of pagan philosophy
- Sabian Cymbals, a Canadian-Armenian cymbal manufacturing company
- BLK Jeez (born 1979), American wrestler formerly known as Sabian

== See also ==
- Saba (disambiguation)
- Sabean (disambiguation), an ancient south Arabian people speaking the Sabaean language
