= SAVA =

SAVA may refer to:

- SAVA (Spain) (Spanish: Sociedad Anónima de Vehículos Automoviles), a defunct Spanish car manufacturer
- Southern African Vexillological Association

== See also ==
- Sava (disambiguation)
