= Sawin =

Sawin is a surname, and may refer to:

- David Sawin (1922–1992), American painter
- George A. Sawin (1878–1961), American football player and electrical engineer
- Martica Sawin, American author and art critic
- Nancy Sawin (1917–2008), American artist
- Patricia Sawin (born 1956), American folklorist
- Wanglam Sawin, Indian politician
- Will Sawin (born 1993), American mathematician

== See also ==
- Sawin, Lublin Voivodeship, Poland
- Savin (name)
