= Sabean =

Sabean or Sabaean may refer to:

- Sabaeans, ancient people in South Arabia
  - Sabaean language, Old South Arabian language
- Sabians, name of a religious group mentioned in the Quran, historically adopted by:
  - Mandaean Sabians, Gnostic sect from the marshlands of southern Iraq claiming John the Baptist as their most important prophet
  - Sabians of Harran, astral religion from Harran (Upper Mesopotamia) associated with Hermeticism and other forms of pagan philosophy

== See also ==
- Sabian Cymbals, a Canadian-Armenian cymbal manufacturing company
- Sabian (disambiguation)
- Saba (disambiguation)
