= Pruzhany =

Town in Brest Region, Belarus

Pruzhany Пружаны
- Town
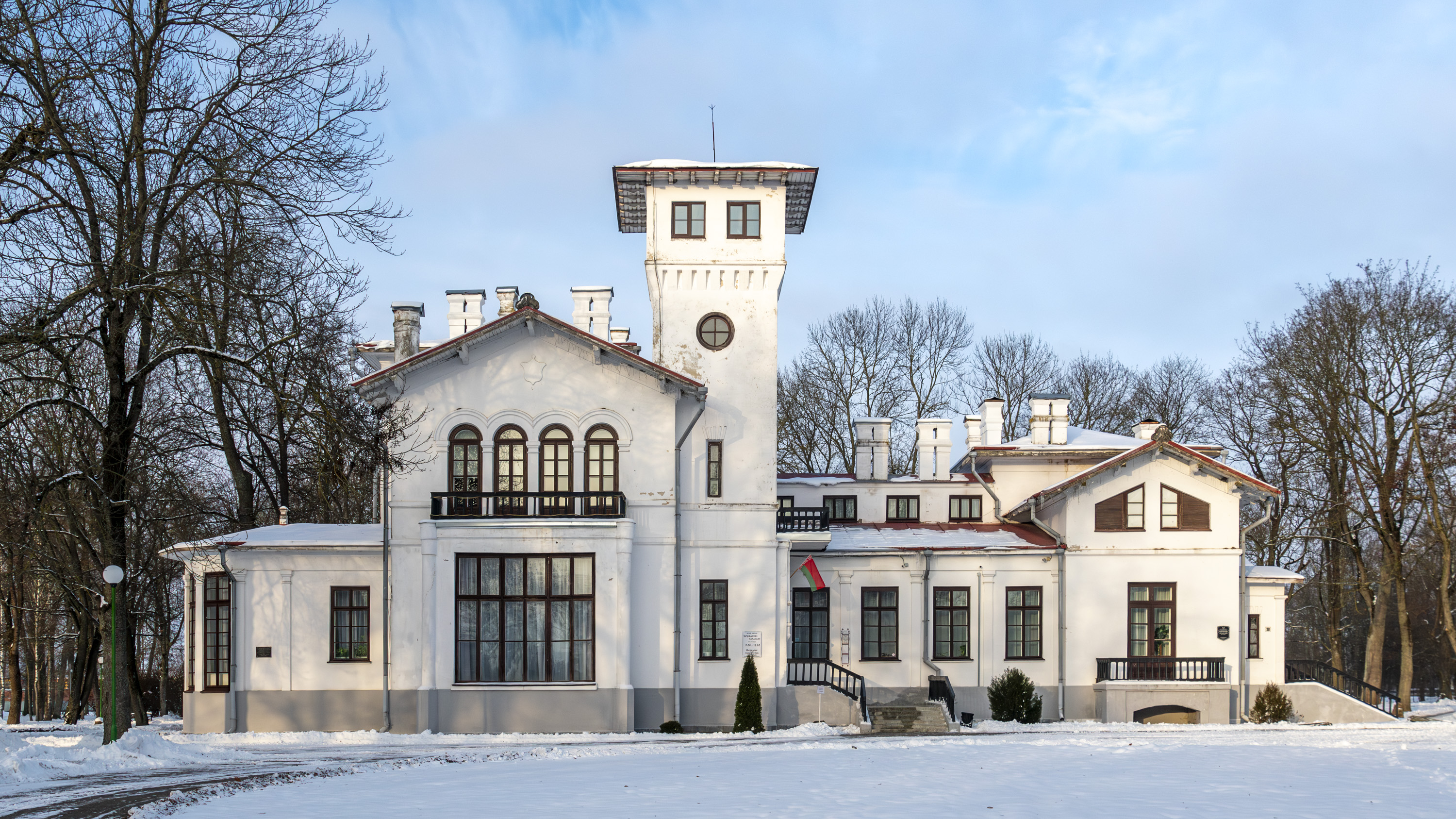
- Pruzhany Palace

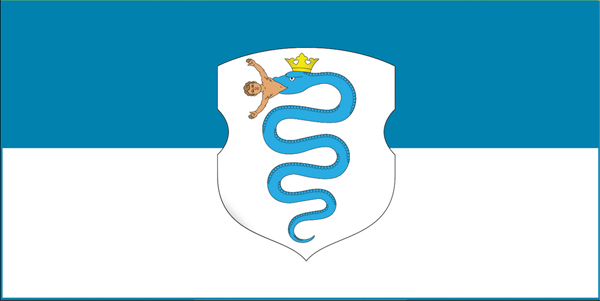
- Flag Coat of arms

- Location within Belarus
- Coordinates: 52°33′24″N 24°27′52″E
- Country: Belarus
- Region: Brest Region
- District: Pruzhany District
- Mentioned: 1487

Population (2025)
  - Total: 18,824
- Time zone: UTC+3 (MSK)
- Postal code: 225133
- Area code: +375 1632
- License plate: 1

Pruzhany (Note: Belarusian: Пружаны, romanized: Pružany, IPA: [pruˈʐanɨ], local pronunciation: [prʊˈʒanɐ], [prʊʒɐˈnajɐ]; Russian: Пружаны; Polish: Prużana; Yiddish: פּרוזשענע, romanized: Pruzhene.) is a town in Brest Region, Belarus. It serves as the administrative center of Pruzhany District. The town is located at the confluence of the Mukha River and the Vets Canal, where the Mukhavets River rises. As of 2025, it has a population of 18,824.

== History ==
Pruzhany has been known as Dabuchyn since 1487. In the 16th century, it belonged to queen Bona Sforza of Poland. She brought Renaissance influence and development of trades in this part of the Polish–Lithuanian Commonwealth. In 1589, her daughter Anna granted a town charter and the coat of arms of Pruzhany (a blue snake swallowing a baby on a silver shield). The coat of arms was borrowed from that of the Sforza family of Milan. Pruzhany was a center of pottery trade at those times. In the mid-19th century, a wealthy Polish landlord, Walenty Szwykowski, laid out a park and built a pretentious palace that houses a museum today, after a restoration. The museum has a rich collection on the history and arts of the region. Another tourist attraction is the landmark at the confluence of the Mukha River and the Vets Canal. It presents a statue of a passionate pair rising over waves. The Catholic Church of the Assumption of the Blessed Virgin Mary was consecrated in 1884.

The Jewish population in 1900 was 5,080. During World War II, Pruzhany was occupied by the Germans from 26 June 1941 to 17 July 1944. In 1941, the Nazis herded the Jews of Białystok and the vicinity here to create a ghetto. In Aktion roundups on 28-31 January 1943, the Nazis deported 10,000 Jews of the Pruzhany ghetto to Auschwitz, via Birkenau, where the men, women and children were murdered.

In 2003, the central part of the town was reconstructed to prepare the town for the national harvest festival “Dažynki” in autumn 2003.

Pruzhany is the birthplace of Joseph B. Soloveitchik, the Torah scholar and Jewish leader. Also, the American actor Mandy Patinkin descends from ancestors from Pruzhany (as well as the nearby shtetl of Drahichyn).

Raisa Žuk-Hryškievič, a prominent figure of the Belarusian diaspora, was born in Pruzhany in 1919.

The former Pruzhany (air base) is nearby.

== Climate ==
Climate data for Pruzhany (1991–2020)
Month	Jan	Feb	Mar	Apr	May	Jun	Jul	Aug	Sep	Oct	Nov	Dec	Year
Record high °C (°F)	5.9 (42.6)	8.2 (46.8)	15.3 (59.5)	23.2 (73.8)	27.3 (81.1)	30.2 (86.4)	31.8 (89.2)	31.7 (89.1)	26.7 (80.1)	20.7 (69.3)	13.4 (56.1)	7.2 (45.0)	31.8 (89.2)
Mean daily maximum °C (°F)	−0.7 (30.7)	0.7 (33.3)	6.1 (43.0)	13.8 (56.8)	19.5 (67.1)	22.9 (73.2)	25.1 (77.2)	24.6 (76.3)	18.7 (65.7)	11.9 (53.4)	5.2 (41.4)	0.7 (33.3)	12.4 (54.3)
Daily mean °C (°F)	−3.1 (26.4)	−2.2 (28.0)	1.8 (35.2)	8.4 (47.1)	13.8 (56.8)	17.2 (63.0)	19.3 (66.7)	18.5 (65.3)	13.2 (55.8)	7.7 (45.9)	2.7 (36.9)	−1.5 (29.3)	8.0 (46.4)
Mean daily minimum °C (°F)	−5.7 (21.7)	−5.2 (22.6)	−2.0 (28.4)	3.0 (37.4)	7.7 (45.9)	11.1 (52.0)	13.3 (55.9)	12.5 (54.5)	8.3 (46.9)	3.9 (39.0)	0.2 (32.4)	−3.9 (25.0)	3.6 (38.5)
Record low °C (°F)	−19.0 (−2.2)	−16.7 (1.9)	−10.5 (13.1)	−3.5 (25.7)	0.7 (33.3)	4.9 (40.8)	7.9 (46.2)	6.2 (43.2)	0.8 (33.4)	−3.9 (25.0)	−8.3 (17.1)	−14.6 (5.7)	−19.0 (−2.2)
Average precipitation mm (inches)	34.6 (1.36)	31.9 (1.26)	33.4 (1.31)	36.8 (1.45)	62.0 (2.44)	61.9 (2.44)	87.4 (3.44)	59.2 (2.33)	56.7 (2.23)	42.3 (1.67)	38.2 (1.50)	38.4 (1.51)	582.8 (22.94)
Average precipitation days (≥ 1.0 mm)	9.2	8.7	8.3	7.5	9.3	9.1	9.8	7.3	7.8	8.1	9.0	9.4	103.5
Source: NOAA

== Gallery ==
One of the tourist attractions in today's Pruzhany is the landmark at the confluence of the Mukha River and the Vets Canal

== See also ==
- Bielyja Lauki
