= Pruzhany Palace =

Museum in the Belarus province of Brest Voblast

Coordinates: 52.5653°N 24.4577°E

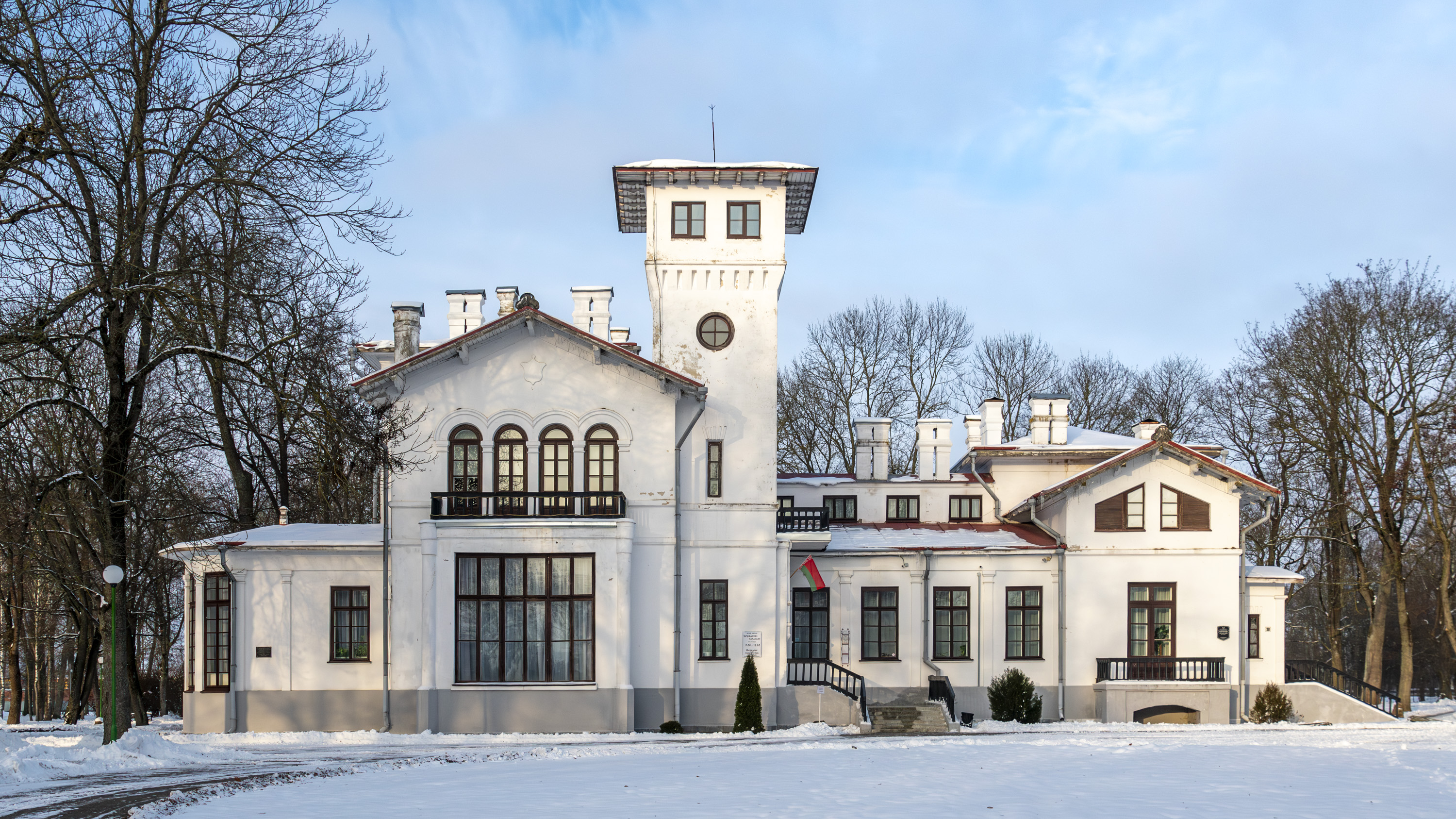
Pruzhany Palace

Pruzhany Palace (Belarusian: Пружанскі палацык) is a museum in the town of Pruzhany, Brest region, western Belarus. It is a 19th-century mansion, at 50 Savetskaya Street. The building is a monument of manor architecture from the Neo-Renaissance era.

== Activity ==
The museum has a rich collection on the history and art of the region. About 8000 tourists visit the museum annually. The museum has more than 6000 pieces, mostly donated.

== Architectural Ensemble ==
The palace grounds include a two-storey stone house with two wings, and a reconstructed greenhouse.

== Park ==
A wide lane provides access from the town to the palace grounds, situated on a landscaped park. The eight square kilometre park holds a variety of trees which include ash, alders, hornbeams, and oak. It was designed by the wealthy Polish landlord Walenty Szwykowski in the mid-nineteenth century.

== See also ==
- Ruzhany Palace, another historical Palace in Pruzhany district of Belarus
- List of palaces in Belarus
