= Savo (given name) =

Savo is a masculine given name found in South Slavic and Italian-speaking places. It can be a cognate to Sava or to Savio.

Notable people with the name include:

- Savo Dobranić (born 1964), Serbian politician
- Savo Ekmečić (born 1948), Bosnian football player
- Savo Fatić (1889–1948), Montenegrin and Yugoslav jurist
- Savo Gazivoda (born 1994), Montenegrin football player
- Savo Gjirja (born 1945), Albanian research engineer
- Savo Jovanović (born 1999), Serbian football player
- Savo Klimovski (born 1947), Macedonian lawyer and politician
- Savo Kovačević (born 1988), Serbian football player
- Savo Lazarević (1849–1943), Montenegrin and Yugoslav military officer
- Savo Martinović (born 1935), Montenegrin-Serbian satirist
- Savo Millini (1644–1701), Italian Roman Catholic cardinal
- Savo Milošević (born 1973), Serbian football manager and player
- Savo Mitrovic (born 1969), Serbian-Canadian ice hockey player
- Savo Nakićenović (1882–1926), Serbian priest and scientist
- Savo Pavićević (born 1980), Serbian-born Montenegrin football player
- Savo Pređa, Serbian general and politician
- Savo Radulović (1911–1991), Serbian American painter
- Savo Raković (born 1985), Serbian football player
- Savo Sovre (1928–2008), Slovene painter and illustrator
- Savo Štrbac (born 1949), Croatian Serb lawyer and author
- Savo Zlatić (1912–2007), Croatian physician, politician and chess composer
