= Savkin =

Savkin (masculine, Russian: Савкин) or Savkina (feminine, Russian: Савкина) is a Russian surname. Notable people with the surname include:

- Agafia Savkina (died 1648), Russian woman executed for witchcraft
- Alexander Savkin (born 1988), Uzbekistani pentathlete
- Larisa Savkina (born 1955), Soviet handball player
