= Elizabeth Selvin =

American diabetes epidemiologist

- Born: 1977 (age 48–49)
- Relatives: Nancy Selvin (mother); Steve Selvin (father) Joel Selvin (uncle)

Academic background
- Education: BA., 1999, Northwestern University; M.P.H., 2001, University of Michigan School of Public Health; PhD, 2004, Johns Hopkins Bloomberg School of Public Health
- Thesis: Coronary heart disease and glycemic control (2004)

Academic work
- Institutions: Johns Hopkins Bloomberg School of Public Health

Elizabeth Selvin (born 1977) is an American diabetes epidemiologist. She is a full professor of epidemiology at the Johns Hopkins Bloomberg School of Public Health.

== Early life and education ==
Selvin was born to parents Nancy Selvin and Steve Selvin. She earned her Bachelor of Arts degree from Northwestern University in 1999 before enrolling at the University of Michigan School of Public Health for her M.P.H. and Johns Hopkins Bloomberg School of Public Health for her PhD. While studying at Northwestern, Selvin collaborated with professor Burton Weisbrod to propose amendments to public policy surrounding non-profit health care providers.

== Career ==
Upon earning her PhD, Selvin joined the faculty at Johns Hopkins Bloomberg School of Public Health as a post-doctoral fellow where she began to research diabetes and heart risks. She led a research project in her first year as a faculty member which found that lowering glucose levels in patients with diabetes could greatly reduce their risk to heart disease. She continued to research risks associated with diabetes and concluded in 2006 that the age of which a patient is diagnosed with diabetes drastically affected their treatment plans. As the lead author, she analyzed data from 1999-2002 of 2,809 elderly people to create a national sample size of the prevalence of diabetes among elderly persons in the general American population. In 2013, she received the Harry Keen Memorial Award from the International Diabetes Epidemiology Group.

As an associate professor, Selvin led a research project which found that diabetes had increased in the United States since 1988. Due to these findings, Selvin and her research team proposed wide range screenings and treatments for blacks, Hispanics, and the elderly, who were more dramatically affected. In the same year, she also led the world's longest diabetes study focusing on a cross-section of adults as they age. The result of the study found that diabetes aged people's minds five years faster than average. In order to assist in diagnosing people with the disease, she co-developed a method to use A1C as a diagnostic tool for diabetes. When asked about the process, she said "the current evidence supports similar interpretation of A1C test results in black and white populations for the diagnosis and treatment of diabetes. Pragmatically, we can use a combination of fasting glucose and A1C to diagnose diabetes while paying attention to any discordance."

In 2018, Selvin published a paper in the journal Annals of Internal Medicine titled "Prognostic Implications of Single-Sample Confirmatory Testing for Undiagnosed Diabetes: A Prospective Cohort Study," which led to revised clinical guidelines by the American Diabetes Association. Her study found that type 1 and type 2 diabetes could be diagnosed using a single blood sample, instead of two separate ones. In 2020, Selvin was the recipient of the Kelly West Award from the American Diabetes Association in recognition of her "significant contributions to the field of diabetes epidemiology."
