= Savaş (disambiguation) =

Savaş is a masculine given name and a surname in Turkish. It may also refer to:

- Savaş, Ergani, village in Diyarbakır province, Turkey
- Savaş, Karkamış, village in Gaziantep province, Turkey
- Savaş, Şavşat, village in Artvin province, Turkey

== See also ==
- Savas (disambiguation)
