= Savin (name) =

Savin (Russian: Савин) is a masculine surname of Slavic origin; in Slavic countries its feminine counterpart is Savina.

It is also a name of Anglo-French origin derived from Savin or Selvin; or of Irish origin, derived from Ó Sabháin.

Surname

- Aleksandr Borisovich Savin (born 1957), Soviet volleyball player
- Aleksandr Mikhailovich Savin (born 1984), Russian footballer
- Alina Vera Savin (born 1988), Romanian bobsledder
- Anatoly Savin (1920–2016), Russian scientist
- Anton Savin (born 1990), Ukrainian football player
- Artem Savin (born 1981), Ukrainian football player
- Denis Savin, Russian solo dancer
- Emanoil Savin (1958–2024), Romanian businessman and politician
- Eric Savin, the alter ego of Marvel Comics supervillain Coldblood
- Francisco Savín (1929–2018), Mexican conductor and composer
- Graham Savin (born 1964), English cricketer
- Hele Savin (born 1977), Finnish inventor
- Ioan Gheorghe Savin (1885–1973), Romanian theologian
- Ivan Savin (born 1981), Russian ice hockey defenceman
- Janice Savin Williams, Jamaican businesswoman
- Jean-Jacques Savin (1947–2022), French adventurer
- John Savin (born 1942), English cricketer
- Maurice Savin (1894–1973), French artist, painter, ceramicist and tapestry-maker
- Nicolas Savin (1768/1787–1894), French soldier
- Ovidiu Savin (born 1977), Romanian mathematician
- Pearl Savin (1914–2000), New Zealand cricketer
- Risto Savin (1858–1948), Slovenian composer
- Ritch Savin-Williams (born 1949), American psychologist
- Robert Savin, 17th century American politician
- Ronald Savin, American military officer and chemical engineer
- Sergey Savin (volleyball) (born 1988), Russian volleyball player
- Thomas Savin (1826–1889), British railway engineer
- Viktor Savin (1888–1943), Russian (Komi) poet
- Vitaliy Savin (born 1966), Kazakhstani sprinter
- Yevgeny Savin (born 1984), Russian football player

Given name

- Savin Sever (1927–2003), Slovenian architect

== See also ==
- Savvin
- Sawin
