= Saba Habachy =

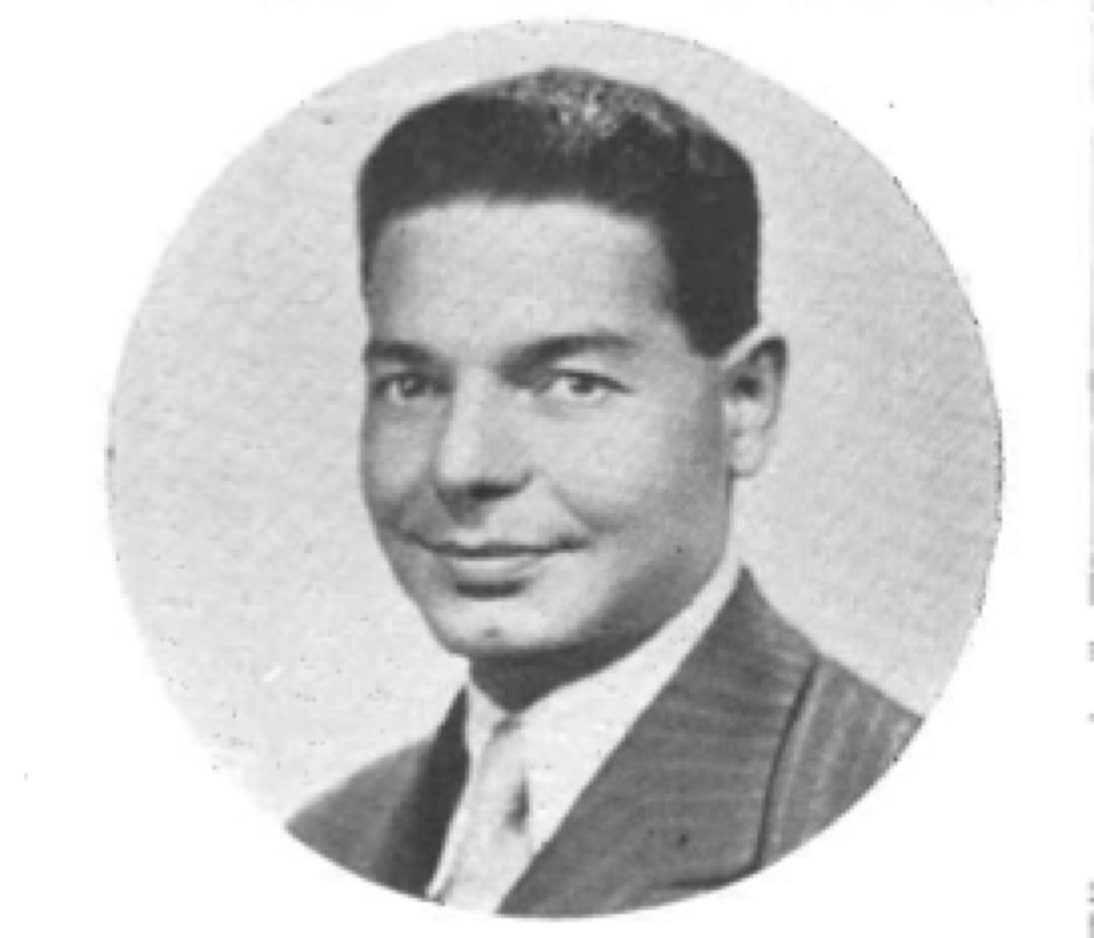
- Born: 2 February 1897; Cairo, Khedivate of Egypt
- Died: 9 June 1996 (aged 99); Cambridge, United Kingdom
- Occupation(s): international lawyer, Minister of Commerce and Industry
- Known for: oil industry consultant
- Spouses: Gamila Gindy; Beatrice Gabrawy
- Children: Susan; Nimet; Nazeeh

Saba Habachy (Arabic: سابا حبشى; 1897–1996) was an Egyptian official, oil industry consultant and international lawyer.

== Biography ==
Born in Cairo, Egypt, Habachy received a doctorate at the University of Paris. He taught criminal law at the University of Cairo and served as a judge and as Egypt's Minister of Commerce and Industry. In 1952, he moved to New York City.

During World War II, he supported the Allied Forces, providing supplies to Field Marshal Bernard Montgomery. He may have been on German general Erwin Rommel's hit list. After the war, as a government minister to King Farouk, Habachy wanted to bring in the West and help industrialize Egypt. When the king was deposed in 1952, Habachy was remembered as being pro-West.

Habachy was survived by his wife, Beatrice Gabrawy; two daughters, Susan and Nimet, and a son, Nazeeh, all of Manhattan; two stepsons, Seti Boctor of Toronto and Saba Boctor of Los Angeles; a stepdaughter, Beatrice Antoun of Cambridge, and two granddaughters.

His first wife, Gamila Gindy, died in 1977. Habachy died 1996 in Evelyn Hospital in Cambridge, England, aged 99.
