= Saba (given name) =

Saba or Sabaa is a feminine given name of Aramaic origin. Notable people with the name include:

== Given name ==
- Saba (rapper) (born 1994), American rapper and record producer
- Saba Kord Afshari, Iranian political prisoner
- Saba Ahmed (born 1985), American founder and president of the Republican Muslim Coalition
- Saba Anglana (born 1970), Somali-Italian actress and singer
- Saba Azad (born 1985), Indian actress and musician
- Saba Azarpeik (born 1981), Iranian journalist
- Saba Aziz (born 1988), Pakistan tennis player
- Saba-Nur Cheema (born 1987), German political scientist and writer
- Saba Dashtyari (1953–2011), Pakistani Baloch academic
- Saba Dewan, Indian documentary film maker
- Saba Doak (1879–1918), American soprano singer
- Saba Douglas-Hamilton (born 1970), Kenyan wildlife conservationist and television presenter
- Saba Esber (born 1959), Antiochian Orthodox Metropolitan
- Saba Faisal, Pakistani actress and news anchor
- Saba Gavashelishvili (born 1987), Georgian judoka
- Saba Yisa Gideon (born 1986), Nigerian politician
- Saba Goglichidze (born 2004), Georgian footballer
- Saba Habachy (1897–1996), Egyptian official, oil industry consultant and international lawyer
- Saba Haftbaradaran (1982–2011), Iraqi student killed in an attack on Camp Ashraf, Iraq
- Saba Hamedy, American news editor
- Saba Hameed (born 1957), Pakistani actress
- Saba Hamzah (born 1986), Yemeni poet and scholar
- Saba Hasan (born 1962), Indian contemporary artist
- Saba Al Heialy, Canadian scientific researcher
- Lady Saba Holland (1802–1866), English biographer of her father, Sydney Smith
- Saba Homayoon (born 1977), Canadian-Iranian actress
- Saba Imtiaz (born 1985), Pakistani journalist and music critic
- Saba Ismail (born 1987/88), Pakistani human-rights activist
- Saba Jallas, Yemeni artist
- Saba Kadisha ("Holy Grandfather"; 1826–1930), Israeli rabbi, kabbalist, and rosh yeshiva
- Saba Kamali (born 1976), Iranian actress
- Saba Karim (born 1967), Indian cricketer
- Saba Anjum Karim (born 1985), Indian hockey player
- Saba Ali Khan (born 1976), Indian jewelry designer and mutawalli (Chief Trustee) of the Royal Trust established in Bhopal
- Saba Kharebashvili (born 2008), Georgian footballer
- Saba Khvadagiani (born 2003), Georgian footballer
- Saba Kidane (born 1978), Eritrean journalist, poet, and political activist
- Saba Komkova, Soviet female sprint canoer
- Saba Kumaritashvili (born 2000), Georgian luger
- Saba Lobzhanidze (born 1994), Georgian football player
- Saba Mahmood (1961–2018), Pakistan-born American professor of anthropology
- Saba Malaspina (died 1297/98), Italian historian, writer, and clergyman
- Saba Mamatsashvili (born 2002), Georgian footballer
- Saba Masoumian (born 1982), Iranian-born Italian artist
- Saba Mubarak (born 1976), Jordanian actress and producer
- Saba Mumtaz, Indian television writer and producer
- Saba Nazir (born 1992), Pakistani cricketer
- Saba Lykke Oehlenschlæger (born 1997), Danish singer simply known as Saba
- Saba Purtseladze (born 2001), Georgian tennis player
- Saba Qamar (born 1984), Pakistani model
- Saba Rajendran (born 1961), Indian politician
- Saba Raleigh (1866–1923), English actress
- Saba Saba (Alex Kirya, born 1977), Ugandan hip-hop artist
- Saba Sadiq (born 1966), Pakistani politician
- Saba Sahar (born 1975), Afghan actress, film director, and producer
- Sabas Saleel (born 1990), Indian footballer
- Saba Sams (born 1996), English writer
- Saba Samushia (born 2006), Georgian footballer
- Saba Saudagar, Indian film and television actress
- Saba Sazonov (born 2002), Russian-Georgian footballer
- Saba Soomekh (born 1976), Iranian-born American academic
- Sabá Sueyro (1889–1943), Argentine politician
- Sabaa Tahir, American novelist
- Saba Talpur, Pakistani politician
- Saba Tavadze (born 1993), Georgian Football midfielder
- Saba Tümer (born 1970), Turkish TV presenter and journalist
- Saba Vahedyousefi, Canadian actress
- Saba Valadkhan, Iranian-American biomedical scientist
- Saba Al-Yahya (born 2009), Saudi footballer
- Saba Youakim (1914–2003), Archbishop of the Melkite Greek Catholic Archeparchy of Petra and Philadelphia in Amman
- Saba Zafar (born 1973), Indian politician
- Moisés Saba Masri (1963–2010), Mexican businessman

== See also ==
- Sabas
- Sabbas
