= Sahwa =

Sahwa may refer to:

== Places ==
- Sahwa, Rajasthan, a village in India
- al-Sahwah, also called Sahwat al-Qamh, a village in southern Syria
- Sahwat al-Khudr, a village in southern Syria

== Organizations ==
- Sahwa movement, a group of Saudi Salafism
- Sahwa militia, a US-funded Iraqi security force

== Historical events ==
- aṣ-Ṣaḥwah l-ʾIslāmiyyah, Islamic awakening
- Sahwa, the literati purges in Joseon Korea.
