= Sabbas =

Sabbas is an Aramaic masculine given name.

Variant forms or transliterations include Sabas, Savas, Savvas, Saba, Sava, Savva, Savo and Sawa.

Sabbas may refer to, chronologically:

- Sabbas Stratelates (died 272), Roman general, martyr and saint
- Sabbas the Goth (died 372), Christian martyr and saint
- Sabbas the Sanctified (439–532), Cappadocian-Syrian monk, priest and saint
- Saint Sava (1174–1236), Serbian prince, monk, and saint

== See also ==
- Saint Sava (disambiguation)
