= Savio, Laukaa =

Savio
- Village
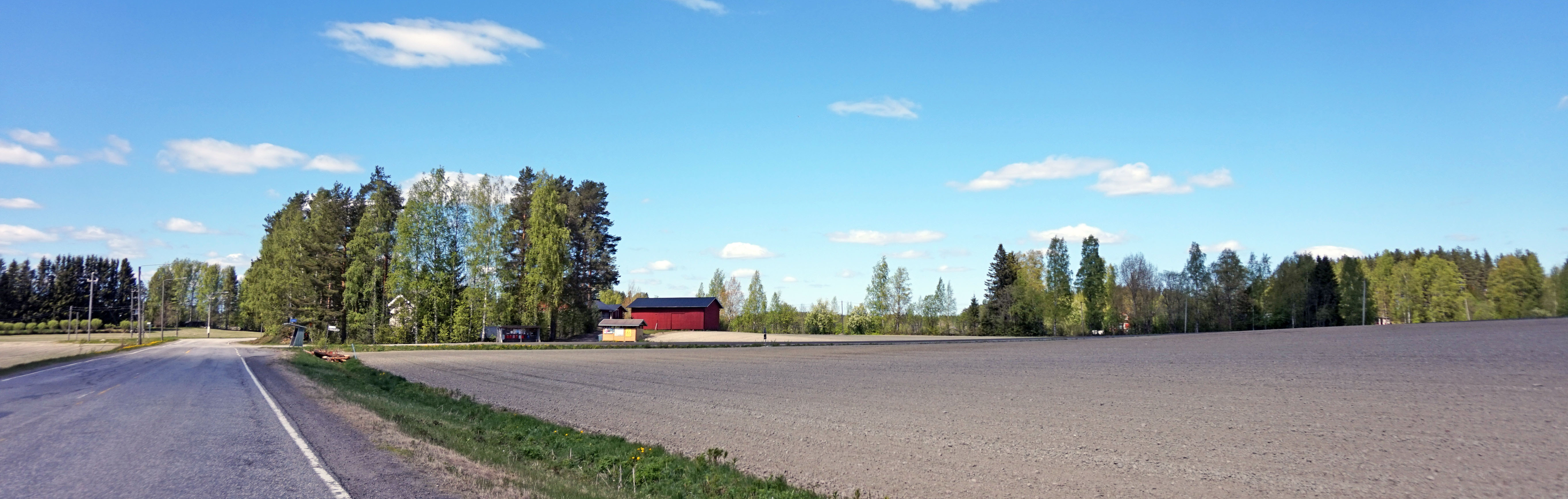
- View from the road Saviontie.

- Location in Central Finland
- Coordinates: 62.282°N 26.029°E
- Country: Finland
- Region: Central Finland
- Sub-region: Jyväskylä sub-region
- Municipality: Laukaa

Population (2020-12-31)
  - Total: 319
- (incl. Puttola)
- Time zone: UTC+2 (EET)
  - Summer (DST): UTC+3 (EEST)
- Postal code: 41400

Savio (Note: Finnish pronunciation: [ˈs̠ɑʋio̞]) is a village in the municipality of Laukaa, Finland, located between the urban areas of Vihtavuori and Lievestuore. The center of Savio lies on an isthmus between the lakes Leppävesi and Pyhtäänjärvi.

The settlement of Savio began in 1554 with the establishment of the Iso-Oksala farm. The name Savio appeared in the 18th century, referring to the area even before it became an official village in 1855.

On 31 December 2020, the statistical area of Savio had a population of 319. The area also includes the village of Puttola.

== Geography ==
Savio is centered on an isthmus between the lakes Leppävesi and Pyhtäänjärvi. The land is quite fertile owing to its fine-grained soil that has accumulated south of the Harjunkangas esker and most of it is used as farmland. Most forests in the village are coniferous, with pines being the dominant tree on Harjunkangas and spruces elsewhere.

The main road in Savio is Saviontie, connecting Vihtavuori in the northwest to the national road 9 in the southeast, near the urban area of Lievestuore and the village of Metsolahti. Most houses in the village are located along the road and its branches, while seasonal homes are concentrated on the shores of Leppävesi and Pyhtäänjärvi.

== History ==
Three prehistoric settlement sites have been found in Savio, all of which are protected today.

Before being settled, the area of modern Savio was mentioned in a listing of Tavastian hunting grounds from 1552 as Karvakangas, owned by Niilo Laurinpoika from the village of Oksala in Pälkäne. Such listings were made to ease settlement of hunting grounds, which had begun in 1542 by order of King Gustav Vasa. In the same year, Jooseppi Laurinpoika (most likely Niilo's brother) had promised to settle in Karvakangas. The first farm in the area was instead established by Olavi Mielikäinen of Savonian origin in 1554 and acquired by Heikki Oksanen, probably from the village of Oksala, in 1565. The farm eventually came to be known as Iso-Oksala.

Borders between villages in Laukaa had not yet been fully established in the 16th century. (Note: The legal definition of a "village" in the region at the time was based on land ownership, often not forming continuous settlements. The extent of a village (which farms were counted as part of a given village) could vary between land and tax registers in the 16th century.) In a tax register from 1579, Oksala was counted as part of a village called Leppäpohja, along with Heiska, Huikko, Kankainen and Toivakka. Since at least the early 17th century, the entire area was considered part of Leppävesi.

The Vähä-Oksala farm was separated from Iso-Oksala in 1618. Both farms were held by the Oksanen family until the late 17th century, when Iso-Oksala passed to the Rutanen family from Palokka. After the Great Wrath of the early 18th century, the farm was owned by Eerik Martinpoika, son-in-law of the previous owner Elias Rutanen. The area came to be known as Savio after the name of Eerik's original home in Jämsä. The ownership of Vähä-Oksala changed around the same time, passing to Matti Häkkinen from Leppävesi. Both farms were divided into two in the mid-18th century.

Despite not officially forming a village, the farms of Savio were treated as their own land partitioning unit (jakokunta). By 1815, when the Great Partition was carried out in Savio, the amount of farms had increased to 16, including some further away from the center in Mehtoniemi. In 1855, Savio was separated from Leppävesi into its own official village, comprising Savio itself as well as the Pernasaari and Juntula farms (modern Vuontee).

A road connecting Pellosniemi and Tarvaala to Toivakka has passed through Savio since the late 18th century. It was moved further inland in the 1840s, with the village's center eventually developing around it. Most houses in the center today were built between the 1930s and 1950s.

== Services ==
=== School ===
The Savio school district was established in 1900 and education began in 1905. The school operated at the Harju farm until a separate building was finished in 1925. In 2018, a new school was built in Vuontee and the old schools of Savio, Vuontee and Tarvaala were closed.

=== Other services ===
The city of Jyväskylä operates a campground in Savio. It is located at the former Mattila farm, established in 1760 with its modern main building dating to 1897. In 1932, the farm was sold in a forced auction to Jussi Rosenberg, a trader from White Karelia. The city of Jyväskylä bought the farm in 1951 and converted it into a summer camp site.

There is also a dance hall in Savio, established in 1949.
