= Savchuk =

Savchuk (Ukrainian: Савчук), also spelled Sawczuk or סבצ'וק/סאבצ'וק, is a Ukrainian family name, widespread also in Israel, Poland, Russia and USA, and may refer to the following:

== People ==
=== Savchuk ===
- Anastasiya Savchuk (born 1996), Ukrainian synchronized swimmer
- Boris Savchuk (born 1948), Israeli violinist
- Hlib Savchuk (born 2003), Ukrainian footballer
- Olga Savchuk (born 1987), Ukrainian tennis player
- Roman Turovsky-Savchuk (born 1961), American artist
- Valentyna Savchuk (born 1975), Ukrainian race walker
- Vladyslav Savchuk (born 1979), Ukrainian footballer

=== Other forms ===
- Alexander Sawchuk (born 1945), American electrical engineer
- Bill Sawchuk (born 1959), Canadian swimmer
- Gavin Sawchuk (born 2003), American football player
- Kim Sawchuk (born 1960), Canadian academic
- Michael Sawchuk (1911–1969), Canadian politician
- Riley Sawchuk (born 1999), Canadian ice hockey forward
- Terry Sawchuk (1929–1970), Canadian ice hockey goaltender
- Piotr Sawczuk (born 1962), Polish Roman Catholic bishop
