= Saint Sava (disambiguation) =

Saint Sava (1169/1174–1235/1236; Serbian: Свети Сава, romanized: Sveti Sava) was a Serbian prince, hieromonk and diplomat who was the first Archbishop of the Serbs and the founder of Serbian law.

Saint Sava may also refer to:

- Sava Stratelates (died 272), Roman martyr and military saint
- Sava the Goth (died 372), Gothic martyr
- Sava the Sanctified (439–532), Greek hieromonk and Christian grazer
- Sava Sedmochislenik (died c. 900), disciple of Saints Cyril and Methodius and one of the Seven Apostles of Bulgaria
- Sava II (1201–1271), third Archbishop of the Serbs and nephew of Sava I
- Sava III (died 1316), ninth Archbishop of the Serbs
- Sava II Branković (1615–1683), Metropolitan of Transylvania and hieroconfessor
- Sava Trlajić (1884–1941), Serbian Bishop of the Eparchy of Gornji Karlovac and hieromartyr

== See also ==
- Savina of Milan
- Saint Sabbas
