= Savichev =

Savichev (masculine, Russian: Савичев) or Savicheva (feminine, Russian: Савичева) is a Russian surname. Notable people with the surname include:

- Daniil Savichev (born 1994), Russian soccer player, son of Nikolai
- Nikolai Savichev (born 1965), Soviet–Russian soccer coach and former player, twin brother of Yuri and father of Daniil
- Yulia Savicheva (born 1987) Russian singer
- Yuri Savichev (born 1965), Soviet–Russian soccer coach and former player, twin brother of Nikolai
