= Sawka =

Sawka is a Polish surname. Notable people with the surname include:

- Jan Sawka (1946–2012), Polish-born American artist and architect
- Karolina Sawka (born 1991), Polish actress
- KJ Sawka, American musician, record producer, and DJ
- Mary Walker-Sawka (born c. 1916), Canadian film producer
- Richard John Sawka II, a.k.a. Colby Keller (born 1980), American visual artist, blogger and former pornographic film actor

== See also ==
- Savka
