= Sawa =

Sawa may refer to:

== Places ==
- Saveh, sometimes transliterated Sāwa, a city in Iran
- Sawa Lake, Iraq
- Sawa District in Gunma Prefecture, Japan
- Sawa, Nepal, a village development committee
- Sawa, Lesser Poland Voivodeship, a village in Poland
- Sawa (river), a small river in Subcarpathian Voivodeship, Poland

== People ==
- Sawa Hrycuniak (born Michał Hrycuniak in 1938), Metropolitan of Warsaw and all Poland and leader of the Polish Orthodox Church
- Devon Sawa (born 1978), Canadian actor
- Homare Sawa (born 1978), Japanese footballer
- Masakatsu Sawa (born 1983), Japanese footballer
- Munenori Sawa (born 1978), Japanese professional wrestler
- Sawa Ishige (石毛 佐和, born 1979), Japanese voice actress
- Sawa (singer), Japanese techno-pop singer and DJ
- Yuji Sawa (1948–2025), Japanese politician

== Other uses ==
- Sawa Station (Ibaraki), a railway station in Hitachinaka, Ibaraki Prefecture, Japan
- Sawa Station (Nagano), a railway station in Minowa, Nagano Prefecture, Japan
- SAWA Defence Training Center, Eritrea, a military academy
- SAWA (non-profit organization) in Palestine
- Radio Sawa, an Arabic-language radio station
- Sawa, legendary character from the myth of the founding of the city of Warsaw
- Sawa, protagonist of the 1998 film Kite

== See also ==
- Sava (disambiguation)
- Sahwa (disambiguation)
