= Savo Nakićenović =

Serbian priest and geographer

Savo Nakićenović (25 January 1882 – 25 April 1926) was a Serbian Orthodox priest, writer, geographer, historian and ethnologist.

== Biography ==
Nakićenović was born on 25 January 1882 in Kuti to father Jovan and mother Ljubica. He finished elementary school in his hometown and high school in Kotor. Nakićenović graduated in theology and sciences in 1904 from the Zadar Theological Seminary. In September 1904, he married Vukosava Novaković of Knin. That same month, he was ordained a priest by Bishop Gerasim Petranović of Montenegro.

At first, Nakićenović was a parish priest in Sasovići, and he also served the parish in Kuti. In the spring of 1910, as an already prominent geographer and ethnologist, Jovan Cvijić invited Nakićenović to the founding assembly of the National Geographic Society of Serbia, of which he remained a lifelong member. In 1911, Nakićenović became a parish priest and schoolteacher in Kuti.

During the First World War, the Austro-Hungarian occupation forces forbade Nakićenović from performing any scientific work. He spent a short time in internment, during which time he was tortured, seriously damaging his health.

In September 1919, Nakićenović founded the grammar school in Herceg Novi, where he taught history, geography and calligraphy there. He received the Order of Saint Sava in 1924.

In 1924, Nakićenović suffered paralysis. As a result of this illness, he died on 25 April 1926 at age 45.

== Scientific work ==
At the beginning of 1906, Nakićenović wrote the anthropo-geographic work "Municipalities of Herceg Novi, Risan, Peraška and Sutorina" which was received by the Serbian Royal Academy of Sciences, for the ethnographic collection "Settlements of Serbian lands - debates and materials". Another important work of his is "Boka - anthropogeographic study" published in 1913 in the edition of the Ethnographic Institute.

From 1911, Nakićenović collaborated in the newspaper Srpska zora from Dubrovnik. He also cooperated with Matica Srpska. For t Srpska zora, he made a study on Herceg Novi, though the manuscript was never published. In Sarajevo, he also collaborated with the Serbian cultural and educational association Prosvjeta. His anthropogeographical study Konavle, which Jovan Cvijić liked very much, disappeared (in manuscript) from the Serbian Royal Academy of Sciences, after Cvijić's death.

Nakićenović also worked on a study of the Knin region. He intended to finish this work in 1924, but his illness prevent it. The Serbian cultural association Zora in Knin published this work in the 1990s, and it was reprinted several times since then.

== Important works ==
Works include:

- Savo Nakićenović, "Knin Region: Settlements and the Origin of the Population" (1st ed.). Knin: Serbian Cultural Society Zora. 1990:
- Savo Nakićenović, "Kninska Krajina: Settlements and the Origin of the Population (2nd ed.), Belgrade: Nikola Pašić, 1999;
- Savo Nakićenović, " Kninska Krajina" (3rd ed.). Belgrade: Nikola Pašić, 2004.

== Literature ==
Prota Savo Nakićenović, "Knin Region: Settlements and the Origin of the Population", Belgrade 1999.
