= Saba Azarpeik =

Iranian journalist and reporter

- صبا آذرپیک
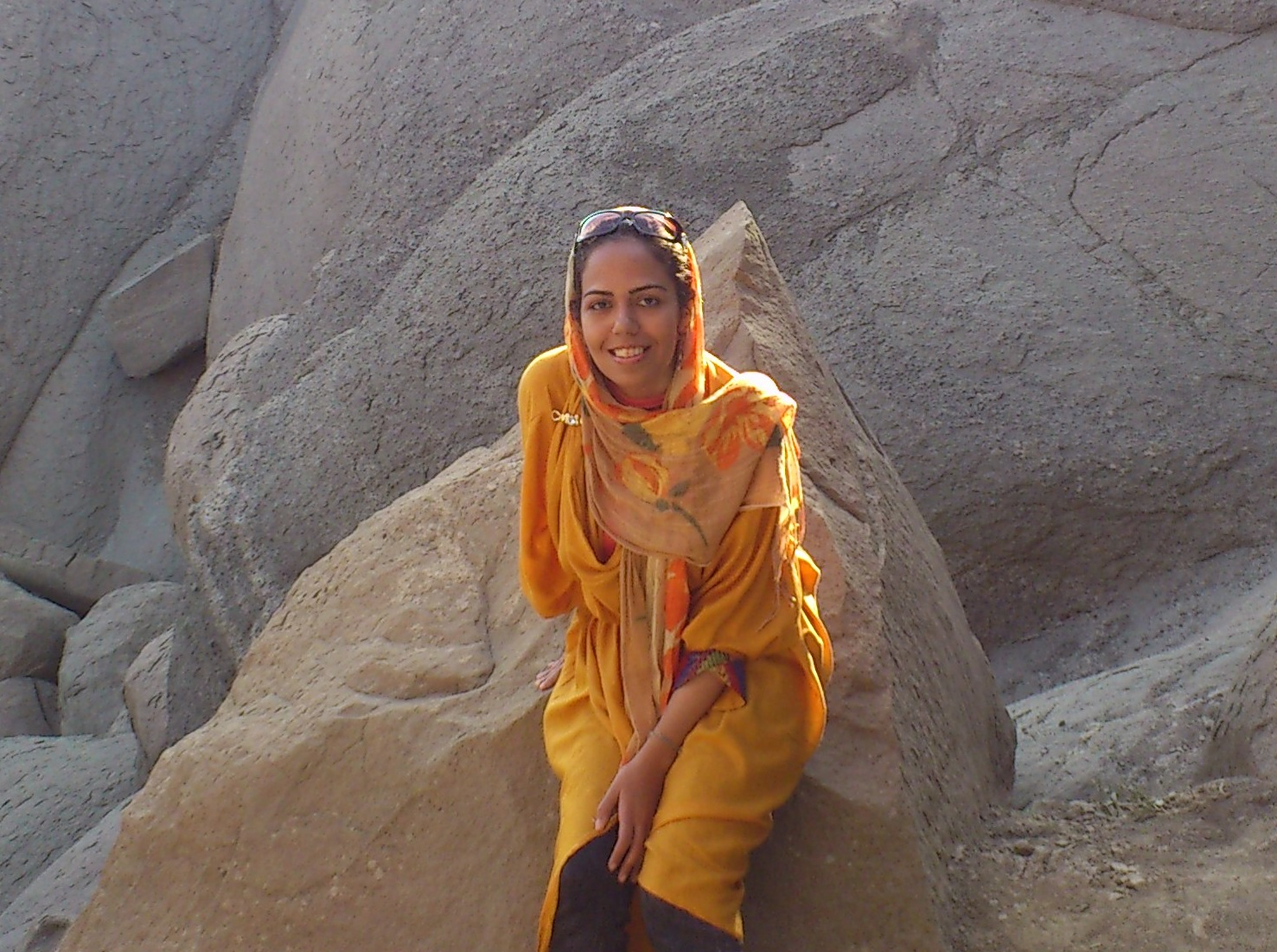
- Born: 1981 (age 44–45)
- Occupation: Journalist
- Known for: Investigative reporting on corruption in Iran

Saba Azarpeik (Persian: صبا آذرپیک; born 1981) is an Iranian journalist and political reporter, formerly affiliated with the reformist newspaper Etemad. She became known for her investigative reporting on corruption cases involving Iranian government institutions.

== Investigative Work ==
Azarpeik gained recognition in Iranian media for her work exposing high-profile corruption scandals. She played a prominent role in reporting on alleged misconduct during Mohammad Bagher Ghalibaf’s tenure as mayor of Tehran, as well as corruption in the Ministry of Industry, Mine and Trade during the administrations of Presidents Hassan Rouhani and Ebrahim Raisi.

She was also active in covering the controversy surrounding the parliamentary credentials of Gholamreza Tajgardoon, who faced allegations of corruption and abuse of power at the outset of the 11th Iranian parliament.

== Arrests and Detentions ==
Azarpeik was arrested multiple times due to her journalistic activities. In February 2013, she was briefly detained, and on 28 May 2014, she was arrested again by security forces at her home. She was held in solitary confinement in Ward 2-A of Evin Prison, controlled by the Islamic Revolutionary Guard Corps (IRGC), and charged with “propaganda against the state.”

According to her lawyer, Mahmoud Alizadeh Tabatabaei, her whereabouts were unknown for weeks, and neither the family nor the attorney were informed of the charges or detaining authority. Azarpeik was denied contact with her family for over 40 days, and eyewitness accounts suggested she was in poor physical and mental condition due to prolonged solitary confinement and intense interrogations. Her family was allegedly warned not to speak to foreign media for the sake of her safety.

On 20 August 2014, after 85 days in detention, she was released on bail of 2 billion rials (approximately US$75,000 at the time), though she had not been formally indicted.

=== 2021 Arrest ===
On 7 February 2021, Azarpeik was arrested again. Her husband, Ataollah Hafezi, announced the detention on Twitter, describing it as illegal and criticizing the judiciary for harming its own reputation on the eve of the Islamic Revolution anniversary. She was released on surety within 24 hours.
