= Savvas (given name) =

Savvas (Greek: Σάββας) is a Greek given name. Notable people with the given name include:

- Savvas the New of Kalymnos (1862–1947), Greek patron saint
- Savvas Chamberlain, Canadian scientist, inventor, professor, and entrepreneur
- Savvas Constantinou (born 1971), Cypriot football goalkeeper
- Savvas Exouzidis (born 1981), Greek footballer
- Savvas Gentsoglou (born 1990), Greek football player
- Savvas Houvartas, Cypriot guitarist and songwriter
- Savvas Kofidis (born 1961), Greek football coach and former midfielder player
- Savvas Moudouroglou (born 1991), Greek football striker
- Savvas Panavoglou (born 1974), Greek discus thrower
- Savvas Pantelidis (born 1965), Greek football head coach and former player
- Savvas Poursaitidis (born 1976) Cypriot footballer
- Savvas Saritzoglou (born 1971), Greek hammer thrower
- Savvas Savva (born 1958), Cypriot composer, musicologist and pianist
- Savvas Siatravanis (born 1992), Greek football midfielder
- Savvas Tsabouris (born 1986), Greek football player
- Savvas Tsitouridis (born 1954), Greek politician
- Savvas Ysatis (born 1968), Greek electronic musician

== See also ==
- Savvas (disambiguation)
- Sava (name)
- Sabbas
