= Sergei Savvin =

Russian footballer

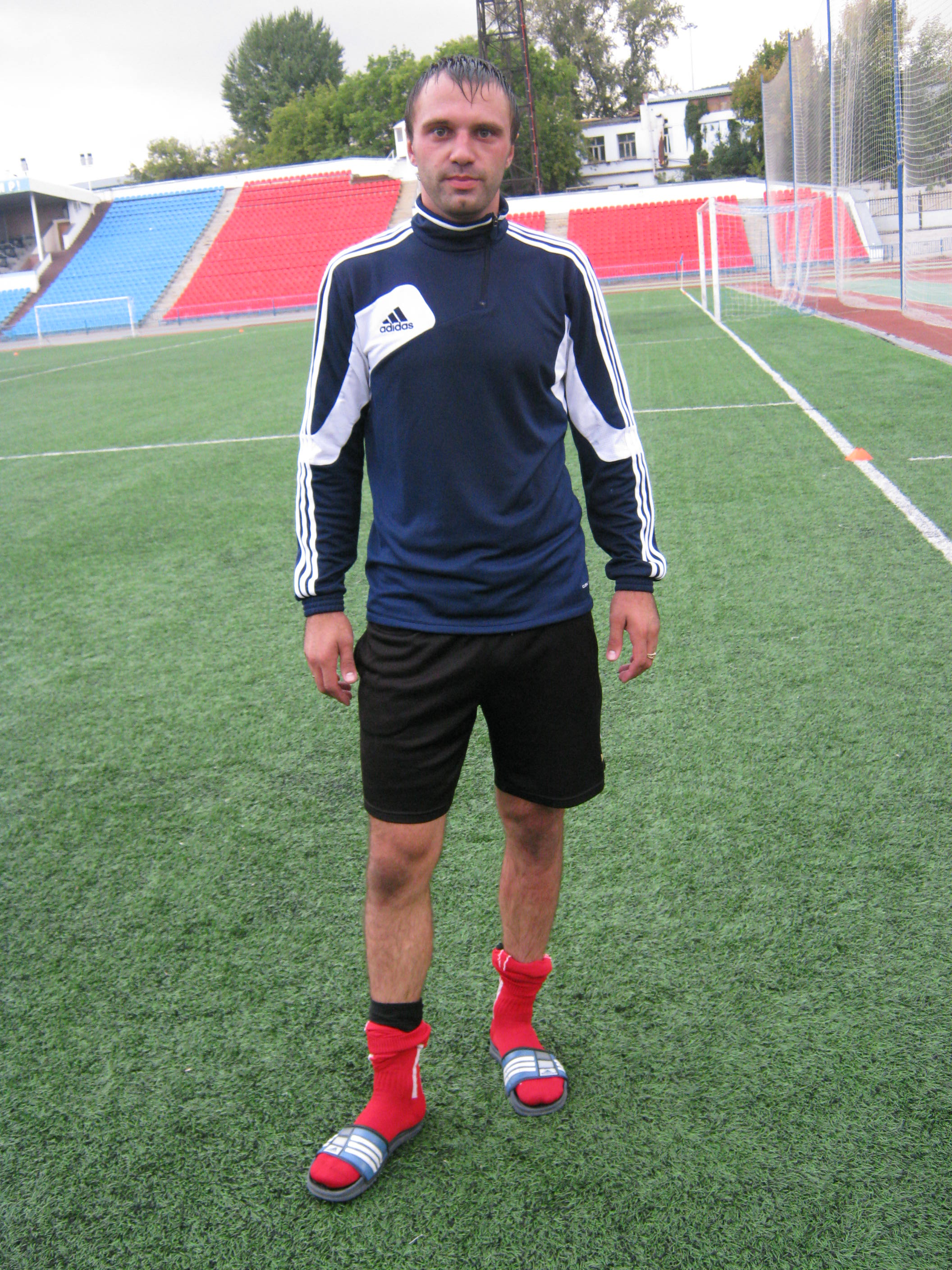

Personal information
- Full name: Sergei Sergeyevich Savvin
- Date of birth: 25 April 1987 (age 39)
- Height: 1.87 m (6 ft 1 1/2 in)
- Positions: Defender; midfielder

Youth career
- Orlyonok Yelets

Senior career*
Years	Team	Apps	(Gls)
2004–2007	FC Yelets	68	(5)
2008	FC Irtysh Pavlodar	3	(0)
2008–2009	FC Yelets	17	(5)
2009	→ FC Metallurg Lipetsk (loan)	0	(0)
2010	FC Khimik Dzerzhinsk	11	(2)
2010–2011	FC Kaluga	16	(0)
2011	FC Lokomotiv-2 Moscow	12	(0)
2012–2013	FC Lokomotiv Liski	26	(1)
2013–2014	FC Oryol	26	(2)
2014–2015	FC Lokomotiv Liski	19	(1)
2015–2016	FC Spartak Kostroma	21	(2)
- * Club domestic league appearances and goals

Sergei Sergeyevich Savvin (Russian: Серге́й Серге́евич Саввин; born 25 April 1987) is a former Russian professional footballer.

== Club career ==
He played in the Kazakhstan Premier League for FC Irtysh Pavlodar in 2008.
