= Savenko =

Savenko is a gender-neutral Slavic surname of Ukrainian origin. Notable people with the surname include:

- Anatoly Savenko (1874-1922), right-wing polizician in the Russian Empire and White Movement.
- Galina Savenko (1966–2012), Soviet sprint canoer
- Ivan Savenko (1924–1987), Soviet painter
- Yuri Savenko, Russian psychiatrist
- Yury Savenko, (1961–2020), Russian politician

== See also ==
- Eduard Limonov - Soviet dissident and Russian nationalist politician, whose birth name was Eduard Savenko.
