= Savvidis =

Savvides (Greek: Σαββίδης) is a Greek surname. Notable people with the surname include:

- Georgios Savvidis
- Giorgos Savvidis
- Ilias Savvidis
- Ivan Savvidis
- Kyriakos Savvidis
- Nikolaos Savvidis
- Pantelis Savvidis
- Symeon Savvidis

== See also ==
- Savvides
