= Savka =

Savka may refer to:

== People ==
=== Last name ===
- Andriy Savka (1619–1661), a revolutionary leader of the Kostka-Napierski uprising
- Mariana Savka (born 1973), a Ukrainian poet and writer
- Ostap Savka (1947–2022), a Ukrainian association football player
- Yuriy Savka (born 2004), a Ukrainian acrobatic gymnast

=== First name ===
- Savka Dabčević-Kučar (1923–2009), a Croatian politician
- Savka Subotić (1834–1918), a Serbian political activist and philanthropist,

== Locations ==
- Savka, Estonia, a village in Tartu County, Estonia
- Savka House, a museum in Kyiv, Ukraine

== See also ==
- Sawka
