= Agafia Savkina =

Alleged witch

Agafia Savkina (died 1648) was a Russian woman who was executed for witchcraft.

She was a serfwoman of the estate of Prince Nikita Ivanovitj Odovetskij in Shatskoe. She was reported for sorcery by one of the estate's peasants to the governor of the estate, the starosta, in August 1647. She was put on trial before the private feudal court of the estate. She was accused of having caused several people to become ill with tumors. Her sister Ovdoti and her sister's father-in-law Tereshka Ivlev were pointed out as her accomplices.

They were accused of having performed the magic by putting grave earth in the drinking glasses of their victims. The case was transferred to the high court in Moscow. Ovdotia managed to escape, but Agafia Savkina and Tereshka Ivlev was condemned to be burned at the stake on 17 November 1648.

The Agafia Savkina case was among the most well documented witch trials in Russia, where witch trials are often poorly documented, particularly about how they ended.
