= Roman Savvin =

Russian footballer

Personal information
- Date of birth: 2 June 1972 (age 54)
- Height: 1.76 m (5 ft 9 1/2 in)
- Positions: Defender; midfielder

Senior career*
Years	Team	Apps	(Gls)
1989	FC Fakel Voronezh	0	(0)
1990–1991	FC Buran Voronezh	50	(1)
1992–1994	FC Fakel Voronezh	32	(0)
1994	FC Orekhovo Orekhovo-Zuyevo	12	(0)
1994	FC Lokomotiv Liski (amateur)		
1995	FC Lokomotiv Liski	25	(1)
1996–1997	FC Gazovik Ostrogozhsk		
- * Club domestic league appearances and goals

Roman Savvin (Russian: Роман Саввин; born 2 June 1972) is a former Russian football player.
