= Carlos Savio =

Uruguayan footballer (born 1978)

Carlos Fernando Savio
Personal information
- Full name: Carlos Savio
- Date of birth: 1 May 1978 (age 48)
- Place of birth: Montevideo, Uruguay
- Height: 1.86 m (6 ft 1 in)
- Position: Centre-back

Youth career
- Peñarol

Senior career*
| Years | Team | Apps | (Gls) |
| 1997 | Peñarol | | |
| 1998 | Villa Española | | |
| 1999–2009 | Rentistas | 96 | (1) |
| 2005 | → Tiro Federal (loan) | 8 | (0) |
| 2007 | → Cobresal (loan) | 7 | (0) |
- * Club domestic league appearances and goals

Carlos Fernando Savio (born May 1, 1978, in Montevideo, Uruguay) is a Uruguayan former footballer who played as a centre-back.

== Teams ==
- (Uruguay) Peñarol 1997
- (Uruguay) Villa Española 1998
- (Uruguay) Rentistas 1999–2004
- (Argentina) Tiro Federal 2005
- (Uruguay) Rentistas 2006
- (Chile) Cobresal 2007
- (Uruguay) Rentistas 2008–2009
