= Steve Selvin =

American statistician (1941–2026)

- Born: July 4, 1941; San Francisco, California
- Died: September 30, 2026 (aged 85); Oakland, California
- Education: University of California Riverside, Iowa State University, University of California Berkeley (PhD in Biostatistics)
- Known for: The Monty Hall problem
- Spouse: Nancy Selvin
- Relatives: Joel Selvin (brother), Elizabeth Selvin (daughter)
- Awards: Berkeley Distinguished Teaching Award (1983), School of Public Health Distinguished Teaching Award (1998), Berkeley Citation (2011)
- Scientific career
- Fields: Mathematics, Statistics, Biostatistics, Epidemiology
- Workplaces: University of Michigan (1990 - 1998), Johns Hopkins University (2004 - 2018), University of California Berkeley
- Thesis: A Biostatistical Investigation of Twins and Twin-Study Methodology
- Doctoral advisor: Jacob Yerushalmy

Steve Selvin (July 4, 1941 – September 30, 2026) was an American statistician and academic who was professor emeritus of biostatistics at the University of California, Berkeley.

== Life and career ==
Born in San Francisco, California, Selvin came up through Berkeley public schools and completed his secondary studies at Berkeley High School. His personal yearbook from BHS from fall 1958 was digitized by the Berkeley Public Library.

He later went on to earn a bachelor's degree in mathematics at the University of California Riverside in 1965. He won a fellowship to Iowa State University but left after one year in his master’s program, instead opting to pursue a doctorate degree back in Berkeley.

Selvin joined the faculty of the School of Public Health at UC Berkeley in 1972, and in 1977, he became the head of its biostatistics division. As the head of the Undergraduate Management Committee, he was instrumental in developing the school's undergraduate program. In addition to his work at UC Berkeley, he also served from 1990 to 1998 as an adjunct professor of epidemiology at the University of Michigan and since 2005 as a professor of biostatistics at the Johns Hopkins University in Baltimore.

UC Berkeley bestowed several awards on Selvin for his achievements in teaching. He received the Berkeley Distinguished Teaching Award in 1983 and the School of Public Health Distinguished Teaching Award in 1998. In 2011, at 70, he was awarded a Berkeley Citation. Selvin published over 200 papers and authored several textbooks in the fields of biostatistics and epidemiology.

In February 1975, Selvin published a letter entitled "A Problem in Probability" in The American Statistician. In it he posed and solved a problem later known as the Monty Hall problem. After receiving criticism for his suggested solution, Selvin wrote a follow-up letter entitled "On the Monty Hall Problem", published in August of the same year. This was the first time the phrase "Monty Hall Problem" appeared in print. Selvin proposed a solution based on Bayes' theorem in this second letter and explicitly outlined some assumptions concerning the moderator's behavior. The problem remained relatively unknown until it was published again by Marilyn vos Savant in her column for Parade magazine in 1990. This publication generated a lot of controversy and made the problem widely known worldwide. As a result, quite a few papers were published on the Monty Hall Problem over the years, and it is featured in many introductory probability and statistics classes and textbooks.

He lived in the Berkeley, California, area and was married to the sculptor Nancy Selvin. The epidemiologist Elizabeth Selvin is his daughter, and the music critic Joel Selvin one of his younger brothers. Selvin died on September 30, 2026, at the age of 85.

== Works ==
- A Problem in Probability. The American Statistician, February 1975 (first publication of the Monty Hall Problem, online copy at JSTOR)
- On the Monty Hall Problem. The American Statistician, August 1975 (first literal mentioning of the phrase "Monty Hall Problem", online copy (excerpt))
- Statistical Analysis of Epidemiologic Data. Oxford University Press, New York, 1991, 3. edition 2004, ISBN 0195172809
- Modern Applied Biostatistical Methods Using SPLUS. Oxford University Press, New York, 1998, ISBN 0195120256
- Epidemiologic Analysis: a case-oriented approach. Oxford University Press, New York, 2001, ISBN 0195144899
- Biostatistics: How it works. Prentice Hall, New York, 2004, ISBN 0130466166
- Survival Analysis for epidemiologic and Medical Research Analysis of Epidemiologic Data. Cambridge University Press, New York, 2008, ISBN 9780521895194
- Statistical Tools for Epidemiologic Research. Oxford University Press, 2011, ISBN 9780199755967
- The Joy Of Statistics: A Treasury Of Elementary Statistical Tools And Their Applications. Oxford University Press, 2019, ISBN 978-0-19-883344-4
