= Nancy Selvin =

American sculptor

- Born: 1943 (age 82–83); Los Angeles, California, United States
- Education: University of California, Berkeley
- Known for: Ceramics, sculpture, installation art
- Spouse: Steve Selvin
- Awards: National Endowment for the Arts, California Arts Council
- Website: Selvin Studios

Nancy Selvin, Rough White, mixed media, 24" × 22" × 6", 2003.

Nancy Selvin (born 1943) is an American sculptor, recognized for ceramic works and tableaux that explore the vessel form and balance an interplay of materials, minimal forms, and expressive processes. She emerged in the late 1960s among a "second generation" of Bay Area ceramic artists who followed the California Clay Movement and continued to challenge ceramic traditions involving expression, form and function, and an art-world that placed the medium outside its established hierarchy. Her work has been exhibited at the Los Angeles County Museum of Art (LACMA), Denver Art Museum, Daum Museum of Contemporary Art and Kohler Arts Center, and belongs to the public art collections of LACMA, the Smithsonian Institution, Oakland Museum of California, and Crocker Art Museum, among others. Critic David Roth has written, "Selvin's position in the top rank of ceramic artists has come through a process of rigorous self-examination … what differentiates [her] is that she eschews realism and functionality, indicating a level of intellectual engagement not always found among ceramicists." Writer and curator Jo Lauria described Selvin's tableaux as "elegiac and stylistically unified" works that serve as "forceful essays on the relationship between realism and abstraction, object and subject, decoration and use." Selvin lives and works in the Berkeley, California area.

== Life and career ==
Selvin was born and raised in Los Angeles. She studied painting and drawing at University of California, Riverside, and turned to ceramics after taking lessons in Iowa in 1966, where she and her husband lived during his graduate studies. After a move back west, she enrolled at the University of California, Berkeley during a time of artistic ferment influenced by the California Clay Movement and similar movements in glass and fiber arts, which reconceived their work as art rather than "craft." She trained there as a sculptor with Peter Voulkos and Ron Nagle, who encouraged spontaneity and improvisation, producing work that departed from traditional ceramics by privileging color and form over function. After earning BFA (1969) and MA degrees (Ceramics, 1970), Selvin had early exhibitions at the Quay (San Francisco) and Anhalt (Los Angeles) galleries and California Crafts Museum, and was featured in group shows at the Kohler Arts Center and Denver Art Museum.

In 1985, Selvin built a warehouse-like, 1,500-square-foot studio in West Berkeley out of corrugated metal and salvaged materials. She continued to show throughout the United States, in featured exhibitions at the Richmond Art Center (1995), Charleston Heights Art Center (1999), Daum Museum of Contemporary Art (2004), and Baltimore Clayworks (2008), as well as major group shows at LACMA, the de Saisset Museum, Ruth Chandler Williamson Gallery (Scripps College), and Society for Contemporary Craft. Selvin taught ceramics at several institutions, including State University of New York-Albany (1970–2), and later, California College of the Arts (CCA), beginning in 2007. In 2018, the "Nancy Selvin Award" for undergraduate ceramics majors was established at CCA to honor Selvin's professional and personal commitment in the field. Selvin is married to statistician and retired UC Berkeley professor of biostatistics Steve Selvin; their daughter, Dr. Elizabeth Selvin, is a professor of epidemiology at Johns Hopkins University.

== Work and reception ==
Selvin's art has included intimate, domestic-related ceramic pieces and still lifes, more expansive mixed-media tableaux, and large-scale outdoor installations. Writers identify the following as characteristic of her work: abstracted, minimal forms that serve as sites to explore painting and composition as much as structure; purposeful investigation of the vessel form, often in relief-sculpture-like and spartan arrangements; a loose, tactile, unconventional approach to surface and materials, including what American Ceramics described as "an almost primal emphasis on process over product"; and a rejection of functionality, enabling intellectual engagement with themes involving the history of utilitarian objects, domestic space, contemplation of the quotidian, and the passage of time. Selvin draws on diverse influences in her work, from early Japanese pottery to the California Clay Movement artists and Abstract Expressionists (particularly their emphasis on spontaneity, materials, and the dissolution of boundaries between surface and form) to less evident sources, such as the austere, slice-of-life photography of Walker Evans.

Nancy Selvin, Quilted Teapot #1, ceramic and mixed media, 5.875" × 7.5" × 7.25", 1978. Smithsonian American Art Museum collection.

=== Early work (1970s and 1980s) ===
Selvin's early work focused on intimately scaled, nonfunctional houseware forms as a format to explore more complex aesthetic and thematic concepts such as abstraction, form and function, and domestic rituals. These free-standing, hand-built vessels often featured large handles, unconventional finishes, and trompe l'oeil details. In her "Quilted Teapot" series, she disguised the solidity of clay by slumping and creasing it to create pots in the form of patchwork quilts, which she finished with airbrushed china paint, glaze, decorative decals and images of her surrounding environment. Described in The New York Times as "whimsical multicolor confections," the teapots convey anthropomorphic qualities as well as freighted cultural, social and feminine associations in their decoration. At this time, Selvin also produced handmade paper works that embedded ribbons and lace and clay wall pieces that reproduced arrangements of paper, tape and cardboard.

In the early 1980s, Selvin's work evolved in a more formal, painterly direction away from freestanding objects and toward arrangements suggesting Western still lifes, expanses of landscape, and Asian craft traditions. Her "Teabowl" series (1981–2) offered spare, rhythmic, arrangements of simple elements engaging form, plane and line: chunky, squared ceramic tea bowls and thin rods of colored glass set on pearlescent, angled, lacquered trays. Surfaces came to the fore, with glaze (unexpectedly on the bowl interiors) and lacquer surfaces that echoed one another (as did the bowl and tray shapes, the latter sometimes functioning like shadows); matte exteriors with airbrushed layers of splatters provided a contrast to the glisten of the glazes, which sometimes oozed over the bowl lips like cake frosting. Los Angeles Times critic Suzanne Muchnic noted Selvin's "poetic sensibility and use of seductive color," which she wrote enabled the work to tow a line "between the honest earthiness of exposed clay and the precious refinement of lacquer over wood."

Nancy Selvin, Still Life: Raku and Steel, raku ceramic and steel, 46.5" × 12.125" × 15.25", 1997. Oakland Museum collection.

=== Still lifes and constructions (1988– ) ===
In the late 1980s, Selvin began creating larger tableaux of ceramic objects in minimal contexts that referenced architecture and domestic space. While this work was more personal and sometimes suggestive of narrative (with the introduction of enigmatic text, as in Rough White, detail), formal concerns of composition, color and surface, as well as process, continued to dominate. The constructions often took the form of rows and arrays of hand-built, pared-down bottle, oil-can, bowl and book forms emphasizing silhouette over three-dimensionality; their irregular, leaning "postures" evoked anthropomorphic qualities—particularly in groupings where differences registered—rendering them both familiar and foreign. Selvin arranged them on ledges, double-sashed wood windows and custom tables made from building-supply materials that she treated as equal design components.

Nancy Selvin, Rough White, mixed media, 2003 (detail).

Selvin painted her forms loosely with underglaze (rather than glazing them overall), in order to explore color apart from form and to meld color and texture. The resulting work features a wide range of material and surface contrasts (exposed raw clay, ghostly layers of matte underglaze, fragmented text, splattered glaze, slate, metal, chalky drywall) and visible processes (expressionistic gouges and brushstrokes, seams, screened images, pencil markings, incised lines) that both individuate and unify the pieces and also draw in the viewer. Curator Suzanne Baizerman wrote that this approach lent Selvin's work, such as Still Life: Raku and Steel (1997), both a sense of thoughtful contemplation—in their minimal forms and compositions—and unstudied spontaneity, expressed through rustic surfaces and gestural brushstrokes. Initially, Selvin worked with saturated colors that muted the effects of light and shadow; her pieces from the late 1990s onward were increasingly painterly and adopted more limited palettes, often of earthy yellow, white and cream tones.

Reviewers describe Selvin's still lifes as both poetic and meticulously ordered, likening them to haiku and the bottle paintings of Giorgio Morandi; curator Mary Davis MacNaughton called it "quiet, understated work [that] encourages us to look for the visual beauty in everyday objects." Others note a vacillation between completion and dissolution, and evolution and decay, suggesting a timeless quality, like relics unearthed from an archaeological site rather than created. Selvin's conscious stripping of practicality from her objects—plugged bottles, illegible labels, "books" without pages to turn, impractical tables—is a key component of the work, moving it beyond utilitarian and purely formal concerns to engage in metaphorical, often wry explorations of form, function and art, and appearance, illusion and reality.

Nancy Selvin, Trophy For Helen (Frankenthaler), ceramic, 35" × 25" × 25", 2016. Crocker Art Museum collection.

In addition to her vessel still lifes, Selvin has created ceramic, book-like works combining enigmatic imagery and fragmentary text that recall ancient cuneiform tablets and explore narrative and abstraction. She has also produced large, abstract gouache-on-paper drawings that critics describe as luminous, textured with scratches, smears and blotches, and simultaneously simple and monumental. In the later 2010s, Selvin has turned to large, free-standing, hand and slab-built terra cotta jars and urns that sometimes reference women Abstract Expressionists, such as Trophy: Helen (Frankenthaler) (2016). Artist-writer Julia Couzens described this work as plainspoken and evocative of homespun quality, simple elegance, and the patina of use as a visceral record of time.

=== Installations and public art ===
Selvin has created several outdoor, site-specific installations. Looking Through Glass (Berkeley, 1991) was a ten-by-sixty-foot, commissioned public work spanning eight, gesturally painted storefront windows with gold leaf borders, each containing a word; collectively, they read "Through the Viewer Art Enters the External World." For Game Board IV (Richmond Art Center, 1995), Selvin arranged ceramic raku balls and feet and gold-leafed log sections on a floor of square slate tiles, engaging the mysteries of systems, games, placement, form and function. In 2003, she was commissioned by Berkeley Civic Arts to create In Berkeley, an outdoor work in which she inscribed sidewalk pavers with notes and facts from the city's 300-year history.

== Collections and recognition ==
Selvin's work belongs to the public art collections of many institutions, including the LACMA, Smithsonian Institution, Oakland Museum, American Museum of Ceramic Art (AMOCA), Arkansas Arts Center, Crocker Art Museum, Daum Museum of Contemporary Art, Everson Museum of Art, Kohler Arts Center, Mint Museum, The Prieto Collection at Mills College, Racine Art Museum, and University of Iowa Stanley Museum of Art. Her work has been featured in several books, including American Studio Ceramics: Innovation and Identity, 1940 to 1979 (2015), Masters: Earthenware (2010), 20th Century Ceramics (2003), The Craft and Art of Clay (1992), and The History of American Ceramics: 1607–Present (1988), among others.

Selvin has been awarded fellowships from the California Arts Council (2003) and National Endowment for the Arts (1988, 1980) and has received an UrbanGlass First Prize (1998), Westwood Ceramic National Purchase Award (1980), and California Craftsman Award (1978), among honors. She is also a member of the International Academy of Ceramics (2015) in Geneva, Switzerland.
