= Sava (name) =

Sava is a male personal name in South Slavic languages. Perhaps the most famous example is the Serbian medieval prince turned monk Saint Sava. In Croatia, Sava is found as a male name among the Serbs and also as a female name among the Croats, likewise in Bosnia and Herzegovina, a result of the tradition of naming female children after rivers – in this case, after the river Sava. It is also used in Romanian, where it is also a surname.

== Given name ==
- Saint Sava, Serbian archbishop and saint
- Sava II, Serbian archbishop, saint and son of Saint Sava
- Sava III, Serbian archbishop and saint
- Sava Antić, Yugoslav footballer
- Sava Athanasiu, Romanian geologist and paleontologist
- Sava Babić, Serbian writer
- Sava Bjelanović, Serbian politician
- Sava Caracaș, Romanian army general
- Sava Dobroplodni, Bulgarian writer
- Sava Dumitrescu, Romanian pharmacologist
- Sava Grujić, Serbian soldier, statesman and diplomat
- Sava Grozdev, Bulgarian mathematician
- Sava Henția, Romanian painter
- Leah Sava Jeffries, plays Annabeth Chase in the TV series.
- Sava Kovačević, Yugoslav partisan
- Sava Mrkalj, Serbian linguist
- Sava Mutkurov, Bulgarian officer and politician
- Sava Petrović (prince-bishop) (1702–1782), Metropolitan of Montenegro
- Sava Petrović (botanist) (1839–1889), Serbian botanist and doctor of medicine
- Sava Petrović (painter) (1788–1857), Serbian icon painter and portraitist
- Sava Ranđelović, Serbian water polo player, Olympic champion
- Sava Saračević, Serbian bishop of the Russian Orthodox Church Outside of Russia
- Sava Savanović, alleged vampire
- Sava Šumanović, Serbian painter
- Sava Tekelija, Serbian philanthropist
- Sava Vladislavich, Serbian merchant-adventurer in Russian service

== Surname ==
- Andrei Sava (born 1991), Romanian footballer
- Constantin Sava (born 1973), best known as DJ Sava, Romanian DJ and record producer
- Facundo Sava (born 1974), Argentine footballer
- Gabriel Sava (born 1986), Romanian footballer
- George Sava (1903–1996), British surgeon and writer of Russian origin
- Iosif Sava (1933–1998), Romanian musicologist and pianist
- Maria Sava, Romanian rower
- Marius Sava (born 1978), Romanian footballer
- Mihail Sava (born 1991), Moldovan freestyle wrestler
- Răzvan Sava (born 2002), Romanian footballer
- Scott Christian Sava (born 1968), American animator
- Teodora Sava (born 2001), Romanian singer

== See also ==
- Saint Sava (disambiguation)
- Savva (given name)
- Saba (given name), Georgian cognate
- Sabbas
- Savo (given name)
