= Savinykh =

Savinykh is a Russian surname. It may refer to:

- Danil Savinykh (born 2001), Russian football player
- Valeria Savinykh (born 1991), Russian tennis player
- Viktor Savinykh (born 1940), Russian cosmonaut
  - 6890 Savinykh, minor planet named for the cosmonaut.
