= Savić =

Savić (pronounced [sǎːʋitɕ]; Cyrillic: Савич, Савiч), Savich or Savitch is a Slavic surname, sometimes used as a first name, most common among South Slavs. It can be related to the name Sava or Sava (river).

Notable people with the surname include:

== Savić ==
- Ana Savić (born 1989), former Croatian tennis player
- Aleksandar Savić (1923–1941), Croatian Jewish communist and member of the resistance movement in Croatia
- Branko Savić (born 1972), retired Serbian football player
- Darko Savić (born 1979), Serbian footballer
- David Savić (born 1985), Serbian tennis coach and former professional tennis player
- Dejan Savić (born 1975), Serbian water polo player
- Dušan Savić (born 1955), Serbian former football player
- Dušan Savić (footballer born 1985) (born 1985), Macedonian international footballer
- Duško Savić, former Bosnian Serb association footballer
- Ivan Savić (1949–2005), Croatian Franciscan Catholic priest
- Jazeek Savic (born 2002), German rapper
- Jela Spiridonović-Savić (1891–1974), poet and wife of Vladislav Savić, the Consul general of Yugoslavia
- Luka Savić (born 1991), Serbian footballer
- Luka Savić (born 1990), Slovenian visual artist and philosopher
- Maja Savić (born 1976), handball player from Montenegro
- Maja Savić (born 1979), Croatian Jazz singer
- Marko Savić (pianist) (1941–2013), Kosovo Serb pianist and university professor
- Marko Savić (footballer) (born 1984), Serbian football striker
- Massimo Savić (born 1962), Croatian singer
- Michaela Savić (born 1991), Swedish beauty pageant titleholder and model
- Milisav Savić (born 1945), Serbian writer
- Miloš Savić (born 1987), Serbian bobsledder who has competed since 2009
- Milunka Savić (1888–1973), Serbian woman war heroine from The First World War
- Miroslav Savić (born 1973), Serbian footballer
- Momir Savić (born 1951), Bosnian Serb paramilitary commander convicted for war crimes
- Nenad Savić (born 1981), Serbian-born Swiss football player
- Pavle Savić (1909–1994), Serbian physicist and chemist
- Radmila Savić (born 1961), former Yugoslav handball player
- Slobodan Savić (born 1964), journalist, writer, critic
- Sonja Savić (1961–2008), cult Serbian actress, famous for her husky voice
- Stefan Savić (born 1991), Montenegrin football defender
- Tanja Savić (born 1985), Serbian folk singer
- Vladan Savić (born 1979), Montenegrin footballer
- Vujadin Savić (born 1990), Serbian football Central back, playing for Red Star Belgrade
- Zoran Savić (born 1966), retired Serbian professional basketball player
- Zoran Savić (soccer), retired Yugoslavian soccer forward

== Savich ==
- Vsevolod Savich (1885–1972), Russian lichenologist
- Zach Savich (born 1982), American poet

== Savitch ==
- Jessica Savitch (1947–1983), American journalist
- Mike Savitch (born 1973), bobsledder
- Walter Savitch (1943-2021), American computer scientist

== First name ==
- Savić Marković Štedimlija, Montenegrin-Croatian nationalist publicist and writer
