= Savas =

Savas may refer to:

- Savas, Ardèche, a commune in the Ardèche department, France
- Savas (Zembillas), American Greek Orthodox metropolitan
- Savas Matsas (born 1947), Greek intellectual and politician
- Savas Papapolitis (1911–1973), Greek politician
- Paul Savas, American politician
- Theodore P. Savas, American publisher and writer
- Tommy Savas (born 1984), American actor and producer

== See also ==
- Savvides, related surname
- Savvas (disambiguation)
- Savaş (disambiguation)
- Sava (disambiguation)
- Shabash (disambiguation)
