= Savina (name) =

Savina is both a given name and a surname. As a surname in Slavic countries it is the feminine counterpart of Savin

Given name

- Savina of Milan (died 311), Christian martyr and saint
- Empress Savina, in the 2000 film Dungeons & Dragons
- Savina Cuéllar, Bolivian politician
- Savina Yannatou (born 1959), Greek classical and jazz singer

Surname

- Carlo Savina (1919–2002), Italian composer and conductor
- François Marie Savina (1876–1941), Frenchman who worked as a Catholic priest and as an anthropologist
- Joseph Savina, (1901–1983), Breton woodworker, cabinet maker and sculptor
- Larisa Savina (born 1970), Russian football player
- Nina Savina (canoeist) (1915–1965), Soviet sprint canoer
- Nina Savina (runner) (born 1993), Belarusian distance runner and gold medalist at the 2018 European Marathon Cup
- Valentina Savina (born 1943), Soviet sprint cyclist
