= Sabas =

Sabas is a name derived from the Greek Savvas or Sabbas, and ultimately Aramaic in origin, meaning “old man” or “grandfather.”

Sabas may refer to, chronologically:

== Given name ==
- Abda and Sabas, two early Christian martyrs and saints
- Julian Sabas (died 377), hermit who spent most of his life in deserted parts of Syria
- Sabas of Stoudios (fl. 787), Byzantine abbot who played a leading role at the Second Council of Nicaea
- Sabas Asidenos (fl. 1204–1216), local Byzantine magnate and independent ruler
- Sabás Magaña García (1921–1990), Mexican Roman Catholic bishop of the diocese of Matamoros
- Sabas Pretelt de la Vega (born 1946), Colombian economist, businessman, Colombian Minister of the Interior and Justice and ambassador convicted of corruption

== Nickname ==
- Arvydas Sabonis (born 1964), Lithuanian retired basketball player nicknamed "Sabas"

== Surname ==
- Juan Sabas (born 1967), Spanish former footballer
- Sylvie Sabas (born 1972), French former tennis player

== See also ==
- Saba (given name)
- War of Saint Sabas (1256–1270), fought between Genoa and Venice
