= Savvides =

Savvides is a Greek surname. Notable people with the surname include:

- George Savvides (born 1956), Australian businessman
- George L. Savvides (born 1959), Cypriot politician and lawyer

== See also ==
- Savvidis
