= Joel Selvin =

American journalist

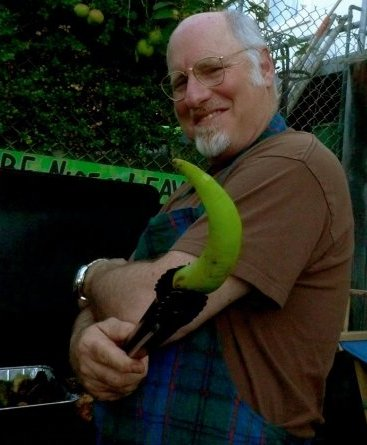
- Selvin prepares to grill a chili pepper, July 2009
- Born: February 14, 1950 (age 76); Berkeley, California, U.S.
- Occupations: Music critic, music journalist
- Writing career
- Period: 1970–present
- Subjects: Pop music, rock music
- Website: www.joelselvin.com

Joel Selvin (born February 14, 1950) is an American San Francisco-based music critic and author known for his weekly column in the San Francisco Chronicle, which ran from 1972 to 2009. Selvin has written books covering various aspects of pop music—including the No. 1 New York Times best-seller Red: My Uncensored Life In Rock with Sammy Hagar—and has interviewed many musical artists. Joel is the younger brother of the late UC Berkeley professor of biostatistics Steve Selvin.

Selvin has published articles in Rolling Stone, the Los Angeles Times, Billboard, and Melody Maker, and has written liner notes for dozens of recorded albums. He has appeared in documentaries about the music scene and has occasionally taken the stage himself as a rock and roll singer.

== Writing career ==
=== Music critic ===
Selvin was born in Berkeley, California. He has stated that he failed to graduate with his Berkeley High School class of 1967. He moved to San Francisco and was hired as a copy boy at the San Francisco Chronicle. Selvin soon wangled a backstage pass for a show at The Fillmore and submitted his first piece to the Chronicle's Sunday Datebook in 1969. Selvin left the Chronicle for a brief, unsuccessful effort in undergraduate studies at the University of California, Riverside where he wrote for the school paper. Returning to San Francisco, he wrote a review of First Step by the Faces for Rolling Stone, published in May 1970.

In 1972, Selvin was hired as an assistant to Chronicle music critic John L. Wasserman, and began to write for both the daily and the Sunday newspaper issues, filing reviews of local shows with rock and roll as well as rhythm and blues performances. When Wasserman died in 1979, Selvin picked up the reins of the Chronicle's pop music coverage. A half year later, one of Selvin's more infamous pieces ran about Bob Dylan's first concert in San Francisco after his conversion to Christianity. In his piece entitled "Bob Dylan's God-Awful Gospel", Selvin wrote:

Genius may be pain, but this guy is not feeling any pain. Anesthetized by his new-found beliefs, Dylan has written some of the most banal, uninspired and inventionless songs of his career for his Jesus phase. He cannibalized melodies from some of his earlier songs to give the new ones their strongest moments.

In 1994, Selvin began managing other pop music staff writers, directing and overseeing their assignments, and editing their contributions, all while continuing to contribute his own reports.

Selvin reviewed music for the Chronicle for more than three decades. His weekly column was observed by competing journalists as one which sometimes contained errors. Bill Wyman worked for a time as the editor of "Riff Raff", the music review column at the SF Weekly, a free weekly newspaper distributed in San Francisco. Wyman and his colleagues regularly printed a section entitled "Selvin Watch" which listed small and large mistakes made by Selvin in his Chronicle column. Wyman once wrote that the rule at "Selvin Watch" was to ignore one or two errors, but publish if there were three or more in any one Selvin piece. For instance, the "Selvin Watch" section of April 1, 1998, included mention of five spelling errors in names of people and songs, and an incorrect recounting of how Metallica was seen to "whip out" the song "Fade to Black" and "ride off into the sunset" with it, even though they did not play that song at that concert.

In January 1999, Derk Richardson interviewed Selvin and other San Francisco Bay Area music critics about the perks that are given to them by music industry promoters. Richardson, at that time the music critic writing for the San Francisco Bay Guardian, evoked a written response from Selvin saying "You shoulda been around when it was really flowing; cases of liquor at Christmas, lavish parties with hookers and drugs (I remember one Lady Sings the Blues affair in particular). Graft is penny-ante these days." Regarding conflict of interest issues that may result from a critic and a musician becoming friends, Selvin responded, "We are encouraged to develop sources as confidants. The better our sources, the more effective our work. But developing these sources inevitably engenders sympathy or, at least, empathy that might be seen as compromising." Selvin continued, "I think everybody has to kind of draw their own lines of what is compromising in their hearts. For instance, I take the free CDs and use them as tools of my work. I would not accept any paid travel any longer (I did in the 1970s)." Selvin commented on remaining hard-nosed and aloof: "I always like to remember what Jesse Unruh—remember him?—said about lobbyists in Sacramento: 'If you can't eat their food, drink their drinks and vote against 'em the next day, you have no business being here.'" Overall, though, Selvin reported that he felt the work of a music critic had its own value: "I like to think that I make contributions to the community at large and, more specifically, the music community that I report on."

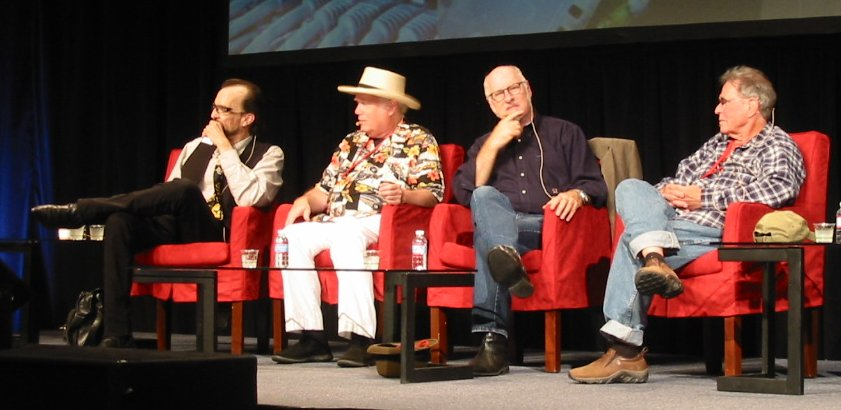
"Legendary Artists: Sounds of San Francisco" at an Audio Engineering Society convention in 2012. Left to right: Mario Cipollina, Peter Albin, Selvin, Country Joe McDonald

On May 26, 2009, the Great American Music Hall hosted a retirement party for Selvin featuring appearances by "Big Al" Anderson, Booker T. Jones, Charlie Musselwhite, John Handy, Bonnie Raitt, Al Jardine, Bud E. Luv, Prairie Prince, Chris Isaak and Scott Matthews. Selvin's ex-wife Keta Bill and daughter Carla, both musicians, took part in the celebration. Gibson Guitar Corporation gave Selvin a Gibson SG guitar which was signed by many of the artists present. In January 2014, Selvin was given the Marquee Award for lifetime achievement at the annual San Francisco nightlife awards, the Niteys.

=== Author ===
In 1990, Selvin published Ricky Nelson: Idol for a Generation, a biography of Ricky Nelson which was nominated by Broadcast Music, Inc. (BMI) for the Ralph J. Gleason Music Book award. The book was made into a TV movie entitled Ricky Nelson: Original Teen Idol, released in 1999.

In 2001, Selvin helped Paul Grushkin in authoring for Hard Rock Cafe, a book describing highlights of the restaurant and nightclub chain's extensive collection of rock and roll memorabilia.

In November 2010, Selvin published Smart Ass: The Music Journalism of Joel Selvin, a collection of 40 years of rock and roll reviews, interviews and articles centered on California performances, especially San Francisco Bay Area ones.

In March 2011, Red: My Uncensored Life In Rock, which Selvin co-wrote with Sammy Hagar, hit No. 1 on the New York Times best-seller lists.

His book Peppermint Twist, co-authored with John Johnson Jr. (with Dick Cami), was published in November 2012 by Thomas Dunn/St. Martins Press. This is the secret story of the top Mafia chief behind the New York City nightclub made world-famous by the Twist dance craze.

Selvin also co-authored the autobiography of tattoo artist Ed Hardy, Wear Your Dreams: My Life In Tattoos, for Thomas Dunne in June 2013. He also co-authored with Epic Records chairman L.A. Reid, Sing To Me: My Story of Making Music, Finding Magic, and Searching for Who's Next, for Harper Collins in 2016.

His Here Comes the Night: The Dark Soul of Bert Berns and the Dirty Business of Rhythm and Blues, published in April 2014 by Counterpoint Press, was called "a masterpiece of research, writing and investigative literature about one of the most influential and little-known songwriters in rock history" by the Cleveland Plain-Dealer.

The Haight, his 2014 book with photographer Jim Marshall, was named one of the ten best rock books of the year by Rolling Stone magazine. Gold medal winner—Best Regional Non-Fiction, 2015 West-Pacific IPPY Awards.

In August 2016, Selvin published Altamont: The Rolling Stones, The Hells Angels, And The Inside Story Of Rock's Darkest Day, a history on the Rolling Stones' concert debacle at the Altamont Speedway.

His Fare Thee Well: The Final Chapter in the Grateful Dead's Long, Strange Trip (with Pamela Turley) is a controversial insiders tell-all account of the twenty years of in-fighting after the death of bandleader Jerry Garcia that preceded the emotional reunion of the "core four" surviving members in historic concerts in California and Chicago in July 2016. The book was published in June 2018 by Da Capo Books. "...smartly steers clear of tie-dyed '60s mysticism," said Washington Post.

The New York Times cited Selvin's "blunt, unpretentious and brisk" style in their review of "Hollywood Eden," his 2021 West Coast pop origin story centered on the University High School class of '58, whose members included Jan and Dean, Nancy Sinatra, Bruce Johnston, Sandy Nelson, Kim Fowley, even Gidget.

In late 2023, the Arhoolie Foundation published the book Down Home Music: The Stories and Photographs of Chris Strachwitz, by Joel Selvin with Chris Strachwitz, the founder of Arhoolie Records. According to Selvin, Selvin was a longtime friend and disciple of Strachwitz, and when Strachwitz suggested publishing a book from his huge collection digitized photographs, Selvin enthusiastically jumped in to help. They worked on the book in the last 18 months of Strachwitz's life, and Selvin finished it shortly after Strachwitz's death in May 2023.

== Music business ==
Selvin was one of the early members of the Rock Bottom Remainders, a rock and roll band composed solely of published writers. Their first public appearance was in 1992. Selvin sang as part of the "Critics Chorus" on one cut of the band's recording Stranger Than Fiction, and again joined the chorus for a performance in Bangor, Maine, in May 1998 where reviewer Kev Quigley noted Selvin's 30-second jumping, screaming vocal solo within the band's profanity-filled version of "Louie Louie".

Selvin wrote one of the chapters of the band's book Mid-life Confidential: The Rock Bottom Remainders Tour America with Three Chords and an Attitude, published in 1994. Selvin said that "the magic of the Remainders is that they got to be a rock band—a royally treated rock band—without having to play like one."

In 1993, Selvin co-produced Dick Dale's album Tribal Thunder.

== Moving image ==
Selvin wrote and produced the 2020 documentary film “Born in Chicago,” which was featured at major film festivals across the country in 2022 before streaming. He is also the writer of “Bang! The Bert Berns Story,” a 2016 documentary based on his book “Here Comes the Night.”

He is also credited as consulting producer on “San Francisco Sound; A Place in Time,” the 2023 two-part documentary that streamed on the MGM+ network.

Selvin has been interviewed several times on camera for documentaries about the music scene. In 2003, Selvin served as a consultant and appeared on screen in the TV movie Get Up, Stand Up: The Story of Pop and Protest, covering the subject of the music world's activity in politics. In 2006, Selvin appeared as himself in the four-hour documentary Bob Dylan 1975–1981: Rolling Thunder and the Gospel Years.

Selvin was interviewed for a Public Broadcasting Service documentary called Summer of Love which was completed in 2007. On the subject of the Summer of Love, Selvin said:

For a minute there ... it was real, and we all knew it, and it was in our hearts and in our minds. And if we could've continued to act on that and grow on that, you know, who knows what happens? But we didn't. And what's left is like a ring around the bathtub. You know, it's just a residue of something much greater.

== Teaching and speaking ==
Selvin has taught classes at San Francisco State University and has lectured at Mills College, Blue Bear School of Music, and at the University of California, Berkeley Journalism Colloquium.

Selvin has taken part in museum events regarding rock and roll memorabilia. In May 1997, he served as featured docent for the San Francisco Sound half of a psychedelic era exhibit of London and San Francisco memorabilia at the Rock and Roll Hall of Fame in Cleveland, Ohio.

On June 16, 2001, Selvin gave an opening address entitled "What a Long Strange Trip It's Been: Setting the Tone for the Weekend" at the "Monterey Pop Revisited" symposium, a conference assembled in honor of a Monterey, California museum exhibition of memorabilia from the Monterey Pop Festival. Selvin told the audience that "Section 43" recorded in 1965 by Country Joe and the Fish was "the definitive recorded example of genuine acid rock."

In July 2020, Selvin curated a photo exhibit, “California Rocks!,” for the Sonoma Valley Art Museum featuring work by Jim Marshall, Michael Zagaris, Baron Wolman, Henry Diltz, Joel Bernstein, others, interrupted by the pandemic.

== Personal life ==
Selvin was married to musician Keta Bill, with whom he had a daughter. The couple divorced. Selvin and Keta Bill were active in Thunder Road, a youth-oriented alcohol and drug rehabilitation center. Selvin is a contributor to H.E.A.R. and is a board-member-at-large for the Arhoolie Foundation, an organization branched from Arhoolie Records to support "traditional and regional vernacular musics".

== Published works ==
Books

- 1990. Selvin, Joel. Ricky Nelson: Idol for a Generation, Contemporary Books, 331 pages. ISBN 0-8092-4187-0
- 1992. Marshall, Jim; Selvin, Joel. Monterey Pop: June 16–18, 1967, Chronicle Books, 106 pages. ISBN 0-8118-0153-5
- 1993. Selvin, Joel. Summer of Love: The Inside Story of LSD, Rock & Roll, Free Love and High Time in the Wild West, Cooper Square Publishers, 376 pages. ISBN 0-8154-1019-0
- 1994. Selvin, Joel; Bachman, Randy. Sammy Hagar, illustrator. Photopass: The Rock & Roll Photography of Randy Bachman, SLG Books, 128 pages. ISBN 0-943389-17-8
- 1994. King, Stephen, with Dave Marsh, Ridley Pearson, Amy Tan, Dave Barry, Tad Bartimus, Roy Blount, Jr., Michael Dorris, Robert Fulghum, Kathi Kamen Goldmark, Matt Groening, Barbara Kingsolver, Al Kooper, Greil Marcus, Joel Selvin. Mid-life Confidential: The Rock Bottom Remainders Tour America with Three Chords and an Attitude, Hodder & Stoughton, 448 pages. ISBN 0-340-61754-3
- 1996. Selvin, Joel. San Francisco, the musical history tour: a guide to over 200 of the Bay Area's most memorable music sites, Chronicle Books, 176 pages. ISBN 0-8118-1007-0
- 1998. Selvin, Joel; Marsh, Dave. Sly and the Family Stone: An Oral History, HarperCollins Publishers, 195 pages. ISBN 0-380-79377-6
- 2001. Grushkin, Paul; Selvin, Joel. Treasures of the Hard Rock Cafe: The Official Guide to the Hard Rock Cafe Memorabilia Collection, Rare Air, 300 pages. ISBN 1-892866-31-5
- 2004. Selvin, Joel; Marshall, Jim. Jim Marshall: Proof, Chronicle Books, 132 pages. ISBN 0-8118-4318-1
- 2010. Selvin, Joel. Smartass: The Music Journalism of Joel Selvin, SLG Books, 416 pages. ISBN 0-943389-42-9
- 2011. Selvin, Joel; Hagar, Sammy. Red: My Uncensored Life In Rock, Itbooks/Harpercollins, 242 pages. ISBN 978-0-06-200928-9
- 2012. Selvin Joel; Johnson, John Jr.; with Dick Cami. Peppermint Twist: The Mob, the Music, and the Most Famous Dance Club of the '60s, Thomas Dunne Books/St. Martin's Press, 304 pages. ISBN 978-0-312-58178-7
- 2013. Selvin, Joel; Hardy, Ed. Wear Your Dreams: My Life In Tattoos, Thomas Dunne Books/St. Martin's Press, 293 pages. ISBN 978-1-250-00882-4
- 2014. Selvin, Joel Here Comes the Night: The Dark Soul of Bert Berns and the Dirty Business of Rhythm and Blues, Counterpoint Press, 433 pages, ISBN 978-1-61902-302-4
- 2014. Selvin, Joel. The Haight: Love, Rock and Revolution -- The Photography of Jim Marshall, Insight Editions, 296 page, ISBN 9781608873630
- 2016. Selvin, Joel; Reid, LA. Sing to Me: My Story of Making Music, Finding Magic and Searching for Who's Next, Harper, 390 pages, ISBN 978-0-06-227-475-5
- 2016. Selvin, Joel. Altamont: The Rolling Stones, The Hells Angels, and the Inside Story of Rock's Darkest Day, Dey Street Books, 368 pages. ISBN 9780062444257
- 2018. Selvin, Joel; Turley, Pamela. Fare Thee Well; The Final Chapter in the Grateful Dead's Long, Strange Trip, Da Capo Books, 280 pages. ISBN 9780306903052
- 2020. Selvin, Joel; Mustaine, Dave; Rust In Peace; The Inside Story of the Megadeth Masterpiece, Hachette Books, 181 pages. ISBN 978-0-306-84602-1
- 2021. Selvin, Joel; Hollywood Eden; Electric Guitars, Fast Cars, and the Myth of the California Paradise, House of Anansi Press, 297 pages. ISBN 9781487007218
- 2023 Selvin, Joel; Strachwitz, Chris. Arhoolie Records Down Home Music J, Chronicle Books, 240 pages. ISBN 978-1-7972-2228-8
- 2024. Selvin, Joel. Drums & Demons: The Tragic Journey of Jim Gordon, Diversion Books, 288 pages. ISBN 978-1635768992
