= Sava Grozdev =

Bulgarian mathematician (born 1950)

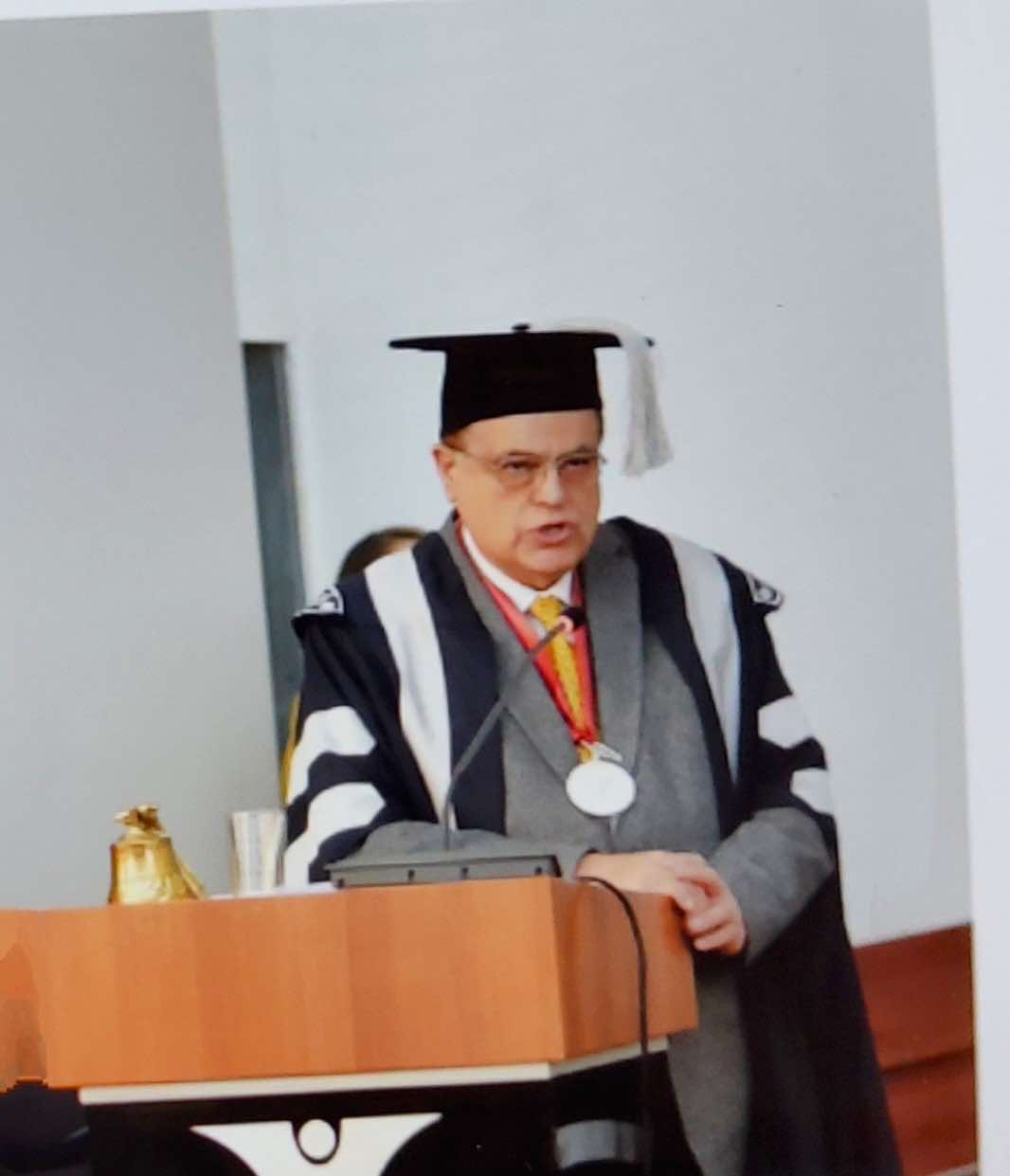
- Born: 13 July 1950 (age 76); Sofia, Bulgaria
- Education: Sofia University, Technical University Lille, France
- Notable work: For High Achievements in Mathematics. The Bulgarian Experience. (Theory and Practice)
- Children: Ivan Grozdev, Konstantin Grozdev

Sava Grozdev (Bulgarian: Сава Гроздев; born July 13, 1950, in Sofia, Bulgaria) is a mathematician and educator.

== Biography ==
His teaching and research activities are in the field of Mathematics and Pedagogical Sciences. He has given courses in Mathematical Analysis, Analytical Mechanics, Generalized Functions, Operational Calculus, Content of Geometry, History of Mathematics, Methodology, Control and Stability of Mechanical Systems, Nonlinear Oscillations, and Chosen Chapters of Mathematics. He has authored more than 400 scientific publications, several books and handbooks, and more than 200 Olympic problems.

Grozdev is most notable for his pedagogical work in mathematics education, both for students and for teachers. He has developed a mathematical model for high achievements in Mathematics.

In 2003 Grozdev was the leader of a group of teachers who took a prize in the International Competition of the American Organization "Best Practices in Education". In the period 1994–2003 he was the scientific leader of the Bulgarian National Team in Mathematics. Under his leadership during Balkan and International Mathematical Olympiads the Bulgarian students won 59 medals out of 60 possible: 33 gold, 24 silver and 2 bronze. The highest achievement was in 2003 when Bulgaria became World Champion at the International Mathematical Olympiad in Tokyo.

Grozdev has received international prizes. In 2003 he received the Sign of Honour of the President of the Republic of Bulgaria. He has been awarded with the Sign of Honour of the Bulgarian Academy of Sciences (2003), the Sign of Honour of Sofia Community (2003), the Jubilee Medal of the Latvian Mathematical Society (2004), the Honourable Professorship of the South-West University "Neofit Rilski" (2006), the medal "St. Cyril and Methodius" – 1st Degree (2007).

== Education ==
In 1969 Grozdev graduated from the English language school in Sofia and in 1974 from Sofia University, Faculty of Mathematics and Informatics with master's degree in complex analysis. During the academic year 1984/85 he specialized in the Technical University of Lille, France.

Grozdev has a DSc degree (Dr Habil degree) in Pedagogy of Mathematics (thesis "Theory and Practice for the Preparation of Talented Students in Mathematics") and PhD degree in Mathematical Analysis (thesis "Abstract Differential Equations in the Resonance Cases"). Grozdev has PhD degree in mathematics (1980) and DSc degree in Pedagogical Sciences (2003).

== Occupation ==
Grozdev is professor in Quantitative methods in the City College – International Faculty of the University of York. He was employed in the Institute of Mechanics with the Bulgarian Academy of Sciences, Sofia University, VUZF University of insurance and finance (Vice-Rector for scientific activities and career development 2015–2020), Institute of Mathematics and Informatics with the Bulgarian Academy of Sciences, lecturing several university courses: Nonlinear Oscillations, Stability and Control of Mechanical Systems, Analytical Mechanics, Mathematical Analysis, Curriculum of Geometry, Probability Theory and Statistics, Applied Mathematics, Contemporary Problems in Mathematics, Additional Chapters of Mathematics, Mathematics for economists, Econometrics, Financial Mathematics, Business Statistics.

He was invited lecturer in France, Greece, Romania, Cyprus, Russia, Northern Macedonia, Kazakhstan.

He is the head of the lecture team and scientific support of preparation courses for students in the Foundation "M. Balkanski" campus, head of postgraduate qualification "Preparation of teachers for work with gifted students in Mathematics".

Grozdev is the founder and since 1992 the Editor in Chief of "Mathematics Plus" Journal (Bulgaria). During a period of 10 years he was the Editor in Chief of "Mathematics and Informatics" Journal (Bulgaria), which is indexed in Web of Science. Grozdev is on the Editorial Committee of "Mathproblems" Journal (Kosove).

He is editor-in-chief of the "International Journal of Computer Discovered Mathematics", and the "Sangaku Journal of Mathematics". He is editorial board member of: "Mediterranean Journal for Research in Mathematics Education" (international) and "Creative Mathematics and Informatics" (Romania).

Grozdev is a member of the Education Committee of the European Mathematical Society. He is the representative of Bulgarian in the European Association "Kangourou sans Frontieres" in Paris (since 1997), member of the SEEMOUS Committee of MASSEE (the Mathematical Association of South-Eastern Europe) in Athens (since 2002), member of the Union of the Bulgarian Mathematicians (since 1978) and General Secretary of the Union in the period 1999–2004, member of the "Young Bulgaria" Foundation (since 1997), member of the "M. Balkanski" Foundation (since 2000), member of the Union of the Scientists in Bulgaria (since 2004), member of the "Balkanski-Panitza Institute for Advanced Study" (since 2010). He is the President of the Association for the Development of Education (Bulgaria), and the President of the Association "European Kangaroo" (Bulgaria).

Grozdev is co-chair of the International Jury of the International competition MITE (Methodology and Information Technologies in Education)[2] with the participation of secondary students, university students and teachers. In the period 2007–2021 he was the leader of the National Commission of the National Mathematical Olympiad for University Students. Also, he was the leader of the National Commission of the National Mathematical Olympiad for secondary students. Presently Grozdev is the leader of the National Commission of the Bulgarian National Contest "European Kangaroo" and the leader of the National Commission of the Contest for financial literacy. The mentioned commissions were appointed by the Minister of education and science and the corresponding competitions were organized by the Ministry of Education and Science. Grozdev has rich experience in the development of online courses, training content, distant learning and testing, being national and International expert in Mathematics education, assessment, control of research, actions on skills, training and career development, Information, Communication and new technologies in education, research and research infrastructures.

Grozdev chaired a considerable number of program and organizing committees of scientific and educational events. Не participates actively in the qualification of teachers. Presently, he is the head of the lecture team and scientific support of preparation courses for students in the Foundation "M. Balkanski" campus[1], head of postgraduate qualification "Preparation of teachers for work with gifted students in Mathematics".[3,4]

He participated in several European Projects: "Maths-Europe-Encyclopedia", "MATHEU" (Identification, Motivation and Support of Mathematical Talents in European Schools),[5] "LeMath (New Communication Technologies to Teach Mathematics by Theatre)[6], etc.

== Achievements ==
Grozdev is the author of more than 400 scientific publications and 30 books. He has more than 500 citations.

Grozdev is the author of a mathematical model for preparation and assessment of gifted students, which is included in [7]. He is the co-author of the computer Program "Discoverer", which is based on Artificial Intelligence, discovering new facts and creating new theorems in Euclidean Geometry. It is noted in ETC Part 6 in the Preamble just before X(11615).that: "Sava Grozdev and his co-author found, by using a computer program, 23 circles (21 of them distinct, 18 of them unnamed until now) all passing through the Parry center X (111). These circles were verified algebraically and described together with their centers.[8]" Grozdev is exceptionally active in the preparation of PhD students. He was academic advisor of 31 PhD students with successfully defended dissertations [9]: 2 from Japan on Japanese mathematics, 1 from Germany on a finance markets and chaotic systems, 2 from Northern Macedonia on Mathematical methodology, 10 secondary school teachers in Mathematics or Informatics, etc.

The most impressive achievements of Grozdev from 1999 to 2003, when the Bulgarian National Team for IMO led by him won 30 medals of a possible 30: 17 gold, 11 silver and 2 bronze. Total for this period Bulgaria was third after China and Russia, overtaking countries with enormous economic and human resources: USA, United Kingdom, France, Germany, Canada, Japan, etc. The culmination was in 2003 during the IMO in Japan when all the 6 Bulgarian participants were awarded gold medals.[10] In the period 1994–1998 the Bulgarian National Team for the Balkan Mathematical Olympiad led by Grozdev won 29 medals from possible 30: 16 gold and 13 silver.

Grozdev co-authored an article awarded in the 2003 International competition of EMS "Raising Public Awareness of Mathematics, RPA".[11] In 2003 a team of teachers led by him was a laureate of the International Competition "Write-a-problem-set International Challenge". In 2003 a team of teachers led by Prof. Grozdev was a laureate of the International Competition "Write-a- problem-set International Challenge" organized by the American Organization "Best Practices in Education" (18 E. 16th Street, New York, NY 10003, USA).

== Recognition ==
- the Sign of Honor of the President of the Republic of Bulgaria, 2003
- the Sign of Honor of the Bulgarian Academy of Sciences, 2003
- the Sign of Honor of the Sofia Community, 2003 [13]
- the Order of Saints Cyril and Methodius (First class: gold medal with red enamet), 2007[14]
- Annual Prize of the Union of Scientist in Bulgaria for higher scientific achievements, 2008
- Annual Prize of the "M. Balkanski" Foundation for higher achievements in Science and Education, 2009
- "Pythagoras" – Bulgarian state prize for higher achievements in Science and Education (outstanding researcher in Public Sciences and Humanities), 2013 [15]
- "L’Ordre des Palmes Academiques-Chevalier" (Order of the French Government, Ministère français de l'Education nationale, de l'enseignement supérieur et de la recherche), 2017 [16]

Sava Grozdev[17,18,19] is Honorable Professor of the South-West University "Neofit Rilski" – Blagoevgrad (2006), Doctor Honoris Causa of "Angel Kanchev" University of Russe (2009), Doctor Honoris Causa of Plovdiv University "Paisii Hilendarski" (2012), Doctor Honoris Causa of the Northern (Arctic) Federal University named after M. V. Lomonosov (2014), Professor emeritus of VUZF (2022). Grozdev is Academician of the International Higher Education Academy of Sciences IHEAS (2008), Academician of the Academy for Informatization of Education (Russia, 2010), Academician of the International Informatization Academy (Kazakhstan, 2015), Academician of the International Pedagogical Academy (Russia, 2019).
