= Nokkakivi =

Amusement park in Lievestuore, Laukaa, Finland

- Interactive map of Nokkakivi
- Location: Ruuhimäentie 3, 41400, Lievestuore, Laukaa, Finland
- Coordinates: 62.245588°N 26.13862°E
- Status: Operating
- Opened: June 15, 2007
- Owner: Bellingham Oy
- Operating season: June to August
- Area: 22,000 m^{2} (240,000 sq ft)

Attractions
- Total: 19
- Roller coasters: 1
- Water rides: 1
- Website: www.nokkakivi.fi

Nokkakivi (Finnish: [ˈnokːɑˌkiʋi]; translates to "Beak Rock") is an amusement park in Lievestuore, Laukaa, Finland. It is located along the Highway 9 (E63), and the distance from the amusement park to the nearest big city, Jyväskylä, is 24 kilometres (15 mi). Nokkakivi is owned by Bellingham Oy. It is the newest amusement park in Finland, although for the time being it has only a limited number of pre-owned rides on its ride list.

One ride is especially notable in the Nokkakivi park because of its long operational history in Finnish amusement parks. Round Up has been in three other Finnish amusement parks: 1961–1976 in Linnanmäki, 1977 in Särkänniemi and 1986–2002 in Tykkimäki, before it came to Nokkakivi park for its opening season.

== Rides and attractions ==
=== Major rides ===
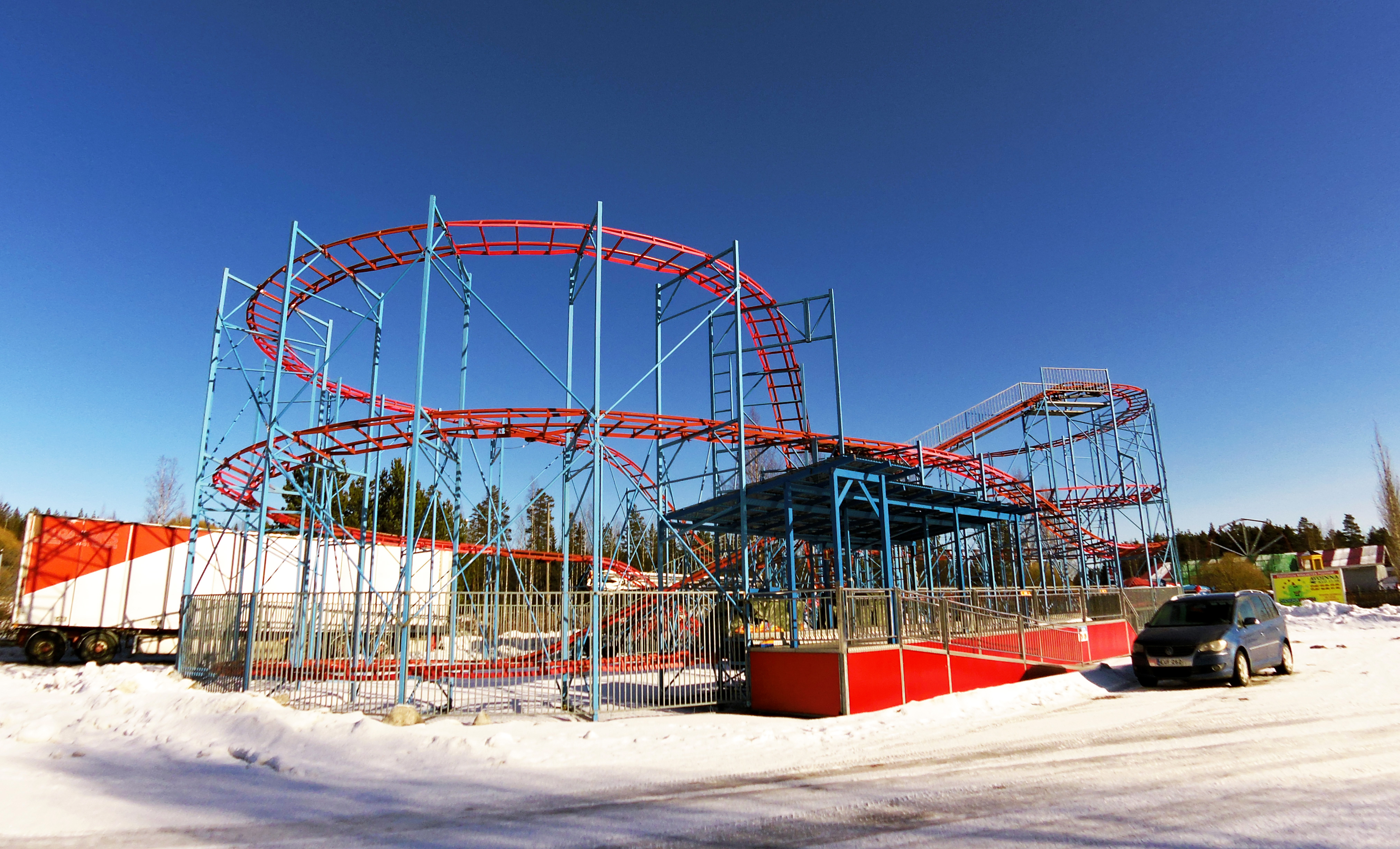
Cyclon in Nokkakivi

Name	Manufacturer	Model	Opened	Ride type
Ferris Wheel	Eli Bridge		2007	Ferris wheel
Miami	Nottingham		2007	Pendulum ride
Paratrooper	Ameco		2007	Paratrooper
Round Up	Nijmeegs Lasbedrijf		2007	Round Up
Dodgems	Ihle		2008	Bumper car
Tilt-a-Whirl	Sellner Manufacturing		2011	Platform-type
Spook Train	Nokkakivi		2013	Dark ride
Cyclon	Interpark		2016	Roller Coaster

=== Family rides ===
Name	Manufacturer	Model	Opened	Ride type
Hully Gully	Sartori		2010	Carousel

=== Kiddie rides ===
Name	Manufacturer	Model	Opened	Ride type
Kiddie Ferris Wheel	Sartori		2007	Ferris wheel
Sky Fighter	Allan Herschell		2007	Carousel
Mini Cars	Sela Cars		2007	Car track
Octopus	Modern Products		2007	Carousel
Canonball Express	Ward		2007	Train ride
Canoe River	Venture		2010	Flume ride
Kiddie carousel	Coulson		2014	Carousel
Saturn	Sartori		2017	Carousel

=== Attractions ===
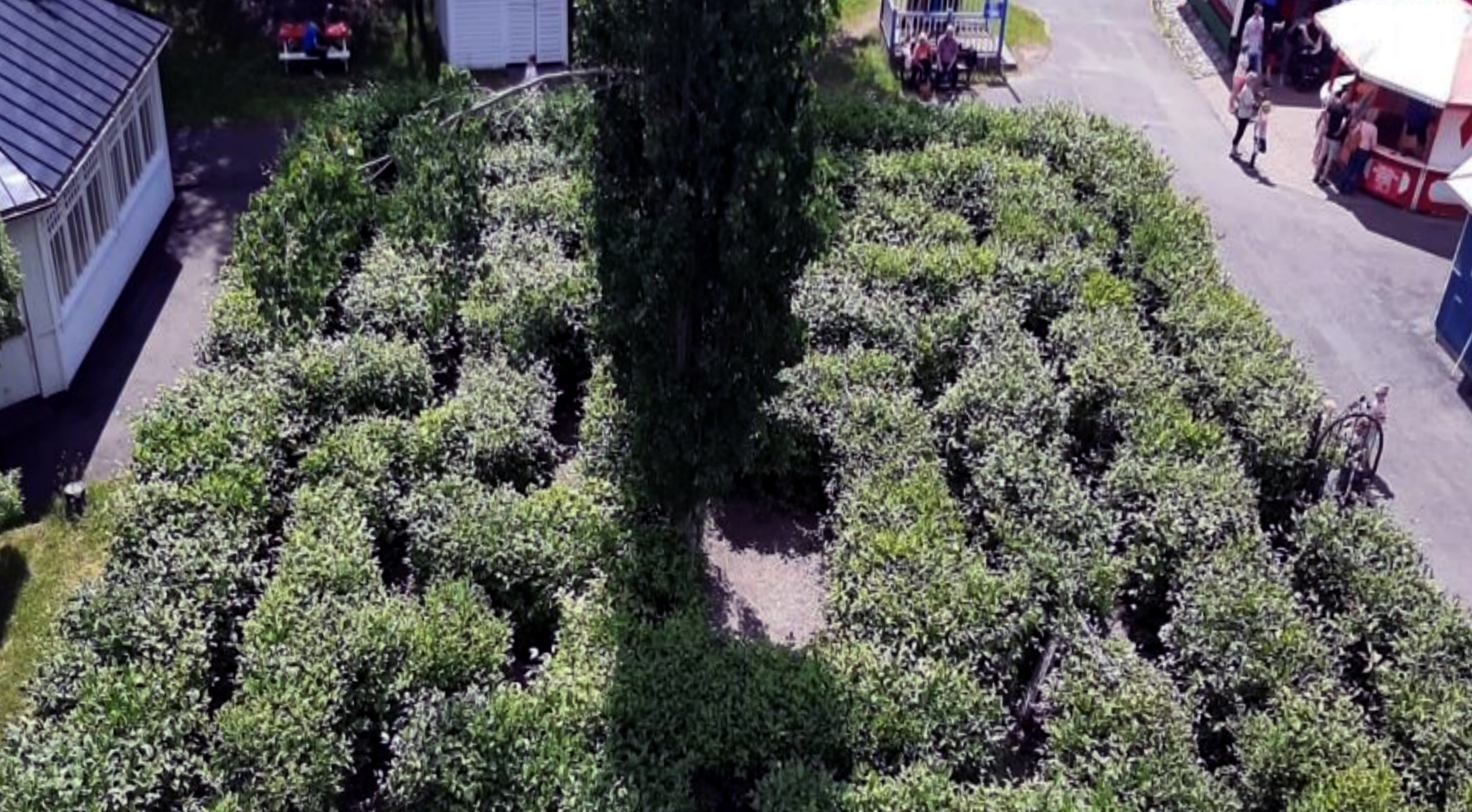
A hedge maze in Nokkakivi

Name	Manufacturer	Model	Opened	Ride type
Hedge Maze	Nokkakivi		2007	Garden maze
Circus World	Nokkakivi		2008	Arcade game museum
Spook Forest	Nokkakivi		2012	Walk through
Ketkula	Nokkakivi		2021	Funhouse
