= Rodrigo Costa =

Rodrigo Costa may refer to:

- Rodrigo Costa (footballer, born 1975), Brazilian football centre-back
- Rodrigo Costa (footballer, born 1976), Brazilian football forward
- Villa (footballer) (born 1983), full name Rodrigo Augusto Sartori Costa, Brazilian football midfielder

== See also ==
- Rodrigo da Costa (disambiguation)
