= Hoho, Finland =

Village in Laukaa, Finland

Hoho
- Village
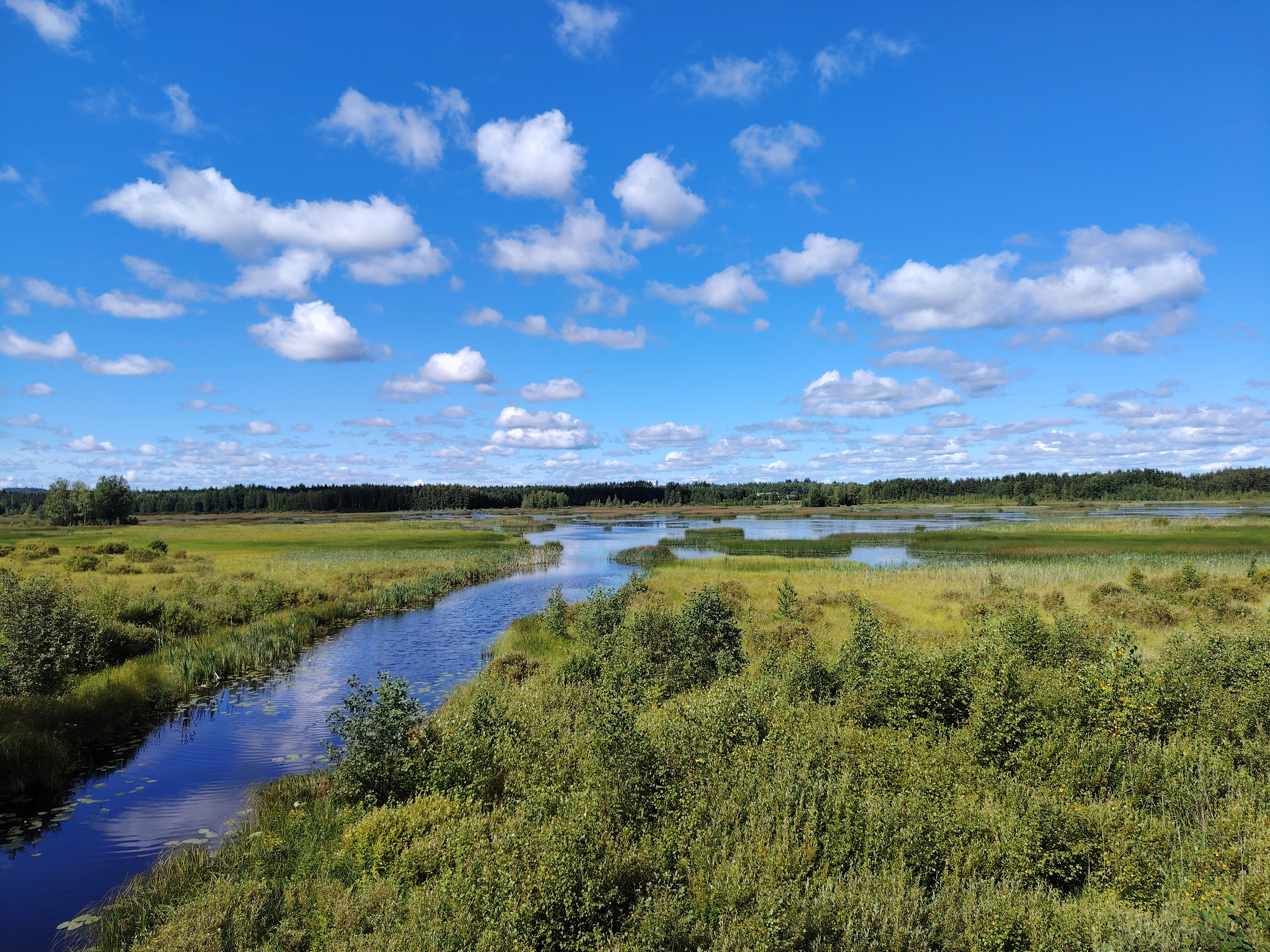
- Lake Lapinjärvi in Hoho

- Location in Central Finland Hoho (Finland)
- Coordinates: 62.2388°N 26.2646°E
- Country: Finland
- Region: Central Finland
- Sub-region: Jyväskylä sub-region
- Municipality: Laukaa

Population (2020-12-31)
  - Total: 186
- Time zone: UTC+2 (EET)
  - Summer (DST): UTC+3 (EEST)

Hoho is a village in the municipality of Laukaa in Keski-Suomi, Finland, southeast of the Lievestuore urban area. It is located near the municipal borders of Hankasalmi and Toivakka. As of 31 December 2020, the statistical area of Hoho had a population of 186.

The lake Lapinjärvi, which discharges into lake Lievestuoreenjärvi via the river Hohonjoki, is located in Hoho. The lake, surrounded by some 30 hectares (74 acres) of marshland, is an important nesting site for waterbirds and shorebirds. Lapinjärvi forms a Natura 2000 site together with Teerikangas, an old growth spruce forest.

Hoho had its own school from 1935 until 2001.
