= Finnish national road 9 =

Finnish highway running from Turku to Tohmajärvi

National Road 9
- Valtatie 9 (Finnish); Riksväg 9 (Swedish)
- Vaajakoski Motorway (Finnish: Vaajakosken moottoritie)
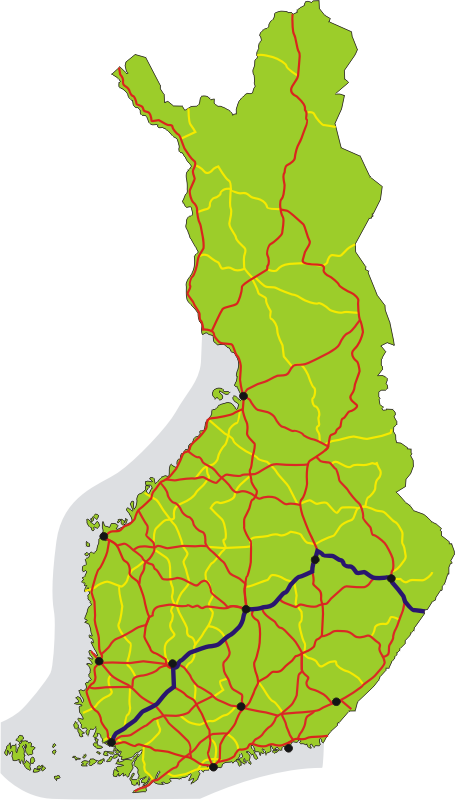

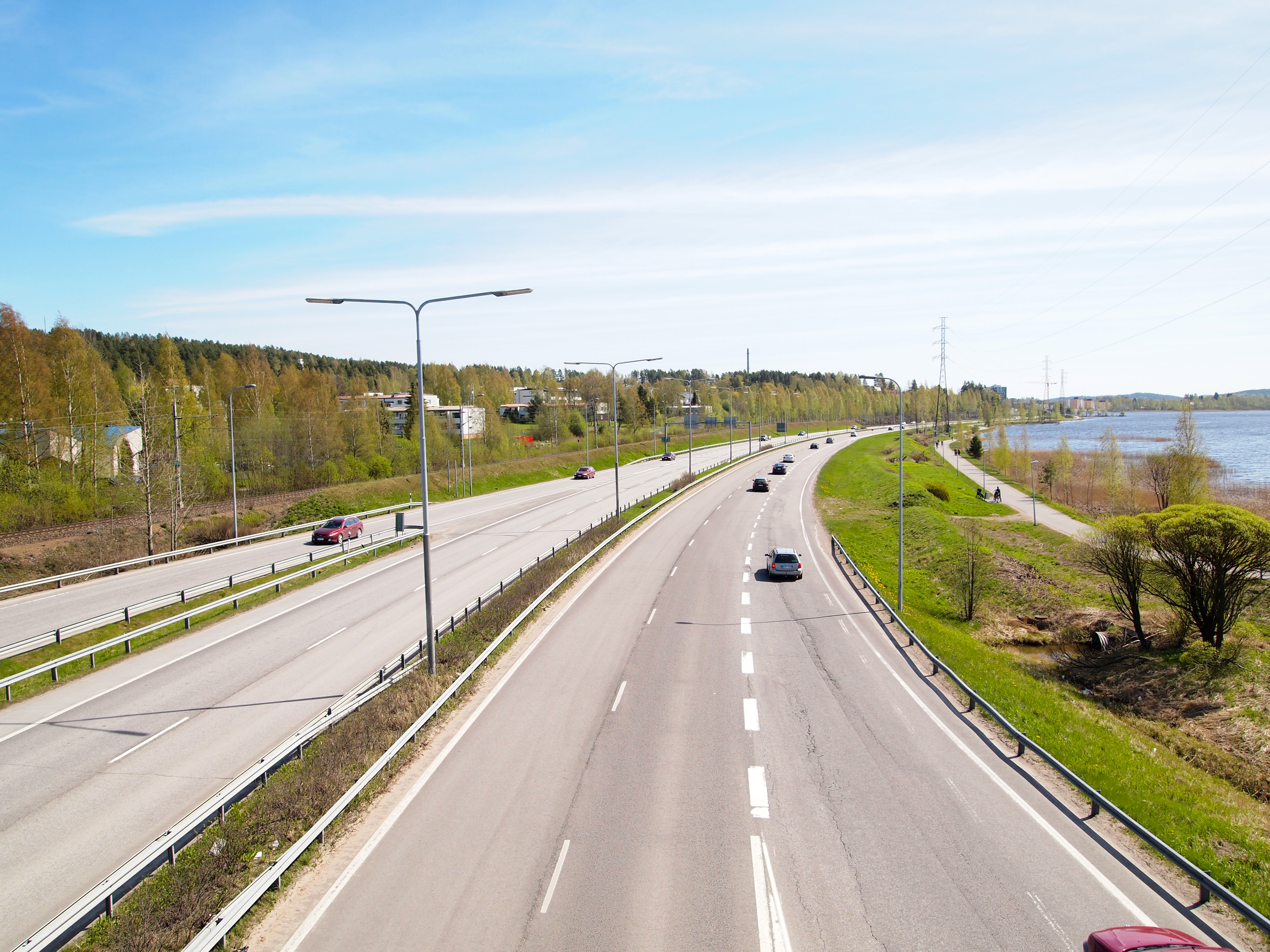

Route information
- Part of E63
- Maintained by the Finnish Transport Agency
- Length: 663 km (412 mi)
- Existed: 1938–present

Major junctions
- From: Turku
- To: Niirala (Tohmajärvi)

Location
- Country: Finland
- Major cities: Tampere, Jyväskylä, Kuopio, Joensuu

Highway system
- Highways in Finland
← Vt 8	→ Vt 10

The Finnish national road 9 (Finnish: Valtatie 9, Swedish: Riksväg 9) is a main route. It runs from Turku through Loimaa, Tampere, Jämsä, Jyväskylä, Kuopio, Outokumpu and Joensuu to the Niirala border guard station in Tohmajärvi, right next to the Russian border. The length of the road is 663 kilometres (412 mi).

Apart from the short section right near the center of Turku, highway 9 from Turku to Vuorela of Siilinjärvi is also part of the European route E63, which continues from Kuopio via Kajaani and Kuusamo to Sodankylä. In the case of Jyväskylä, the highway is known as the four-lane Vaajakoski Motorway (Finnish: Vaajakosken moottoritie). The road belongs to the main roads defined by the Ministry of Transport and Communications and to the Trans-European road network.

== Route ==
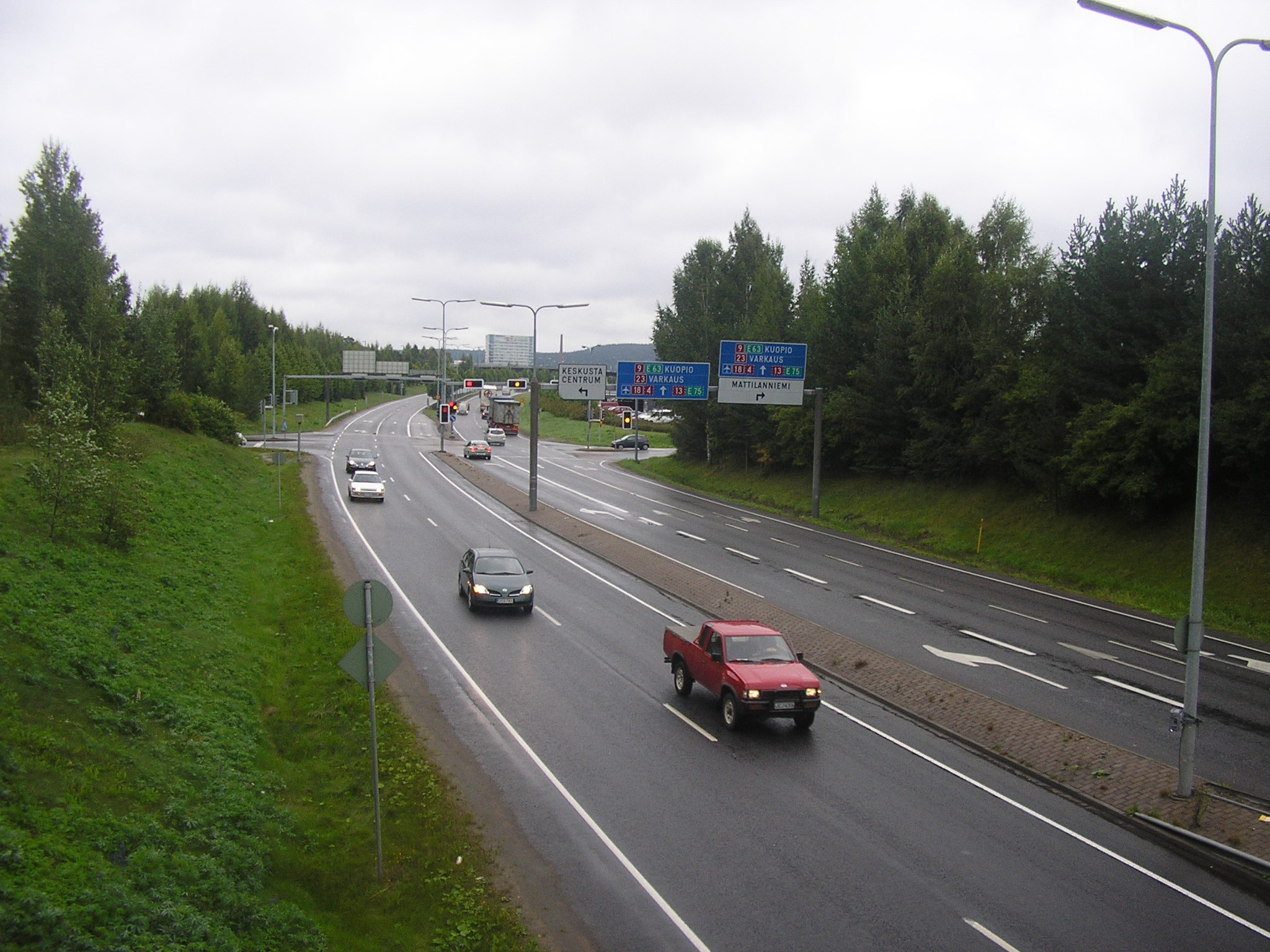
Highways 9 (E63), 18 and 23 (Rantaväylä) in Jyväskylä towards Kuopio

The road passes through the following municipalities:

Turku – Lieto – Aura – Pöytyä – Loimaa – Humppila – Urjala – Akaa – Valkeakoski – Lempäälä – Tampere – Kangasala – Orivesi – Jämsä – Jyväskylä – Muurame – Jyväskylä (again) – Laukaa – Hankasalmi – Pieksämäki – Rautalampi – Pieksämäki (again) – Rautalampi (again) – Suonenjoki – Leppävirta – Kuopio – Siilinjärvi – Kuopio (again) – Tuusniemi – Outokumpu – Liperi – Joensuu – Tohmajärvi.

Highway 9 from Kuopio to Tohmajärvi is part of the Blue Highway, which is an international tourist route from Norway via Sweden and Finland to Russia.

The Nokkakivi amusement park is located along the highway in Laukaa's Lievestuore between cities of Jyväskylä and Kuopio.

== History ==
In the road numbering system of 1938, the route from Turku through Huittinen, Tampere and Jämsä to Jyväskylä was numbered as road 9. The route of the road has changed significantly since these times. Initially, the road followed partly the same route as Highways 2 (from Vampula to Huittinen), 11 (from Huhijärvi in Mouhijärvi to Tampere) and 3 and 12 (from Tampere to Huutijärvi in Kangasala). Even before the Winter War, road improvements had been started by straightening the worst bends, for example between Kangasala and Orivesi. The rehabilitation of the section between Huutijärvi and Orivesi in Kangasala was completed through work projects for the unemployed in 1953–1955, but when completed the road no longer met the requirements of increased traffic. At the end of the 1950s, a four-way intersection was formed on Lake Huutijärvi after the completion of the road through Sahalahti and Kuhmalahti to Kuhmoinen (now regional road 325).

In the early 1960s, the gap between Orivesi and Jämsä was significantly adjusted. The road was lined from Längelmäki's Länkipohja to Jämsä directly, when the old road circled through the village of Halli, Kuorevesi. However, even this road turned out to be narrow and winding before traffic picked up. The first 14-kilometer highway section between Turku and the Lieto station area was completed in 1967. The intersection of Highways 2 and 9 in Huittinen's Mommola, which became known for numerous traffic accidents, was converted into a level crossing in the same year.

In 2000, the Helsinki-Tampere motorway was completed and the route was re-adjusted: about eight kilometers of new roads were built north of Kylmäkoski to the north-west of Toijala, where Road 9 joins Highway 3. The journey between Turku and Tampere was extended by a few kilometers but 19 kilometers of new motorway section were created. The old road from Kylmäkoski to Lempäälä was numbered 190. In 2001–2003, the road between Orivesi and Jämsä and between Korpilahti and Muurame was significantly improved. The orientation of the road was improved by leveling hills and straightening bends, the road was widened, medium-railed bypass lanes and game fences were built on it, as well as new bridges and level crossings.

In 2010, Highway 9 was extended from Kuopio to the Niirala border station by connecting Highway 17 and Main Road 70 as part of it.

== Sources ==
- Autoilijan tiekartta 2007 (in Finnish). Helsinki: AffectoGenimap Finland Oy. 2006. ISBN 978-951-593-047-7.
- "Kansalaisen karttapaikka" (in Finnish). Maanmittauslaitos.
- Grönroos, Matti. "Valtatie 9 Turku–Kuopio–Joensuu–Niirala (Raja), 663 km".
