= August Koskinen =

Finnish politician (1878–1949)

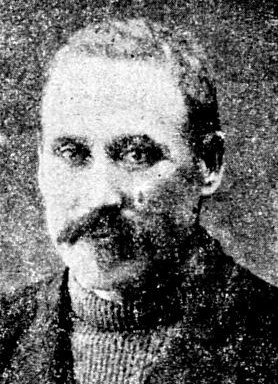
August Koskinen

August Viljam Koskinen (17 November 1878 – 24 October 1949) was a Finnish carpenter and politician. Born in Laukaa, he was a member of the Parliament of Finland from 1919 to 1922, representing the Social Democratic Party of Finland (SDP).
