= Sirkka Lekman =

Finnish politician

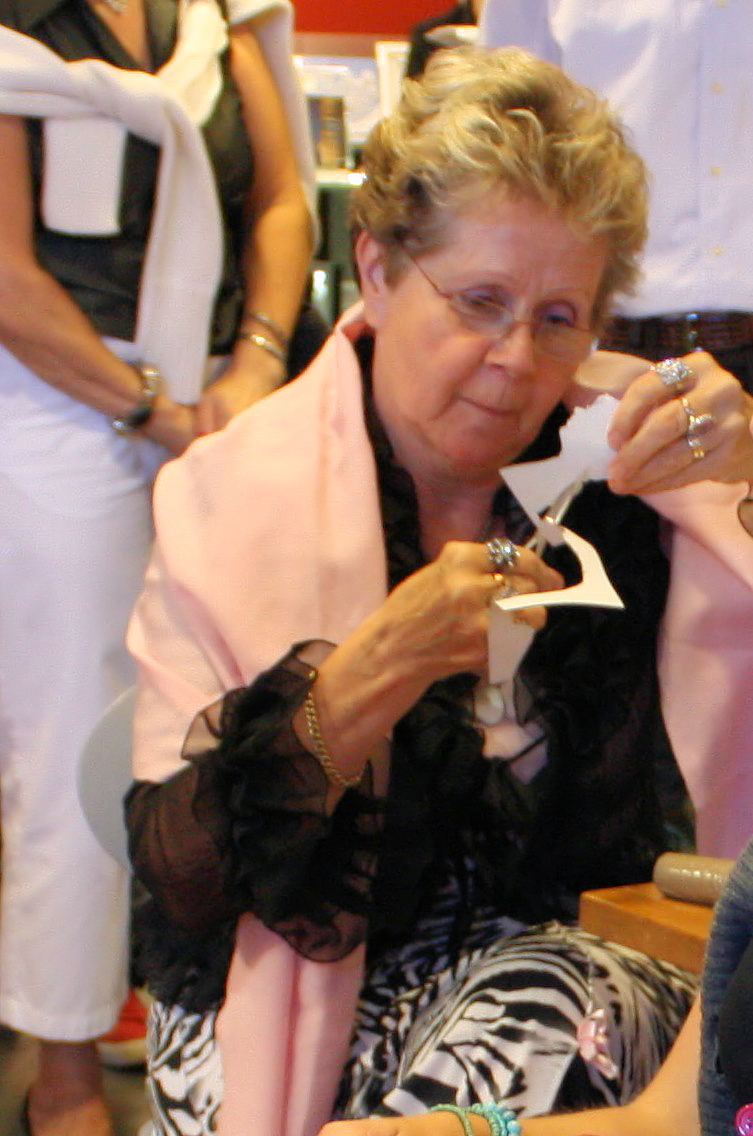
Sirkka Lekman

Sirkka Liisa Lekman (née Manninen; born 13 September 1944 in Laukaa) is a Finnish secondary school teacher and politician. She was a member of the Parliament of Finland from 1998 to 1999, representing the National Coalition Party.
