= Lake Uurainen =

- Uurainen seen from the village of Äijälä in Laukaa
- Interactive map of Lake Uurainen
- Location: Laukaa
- Coordinates: 62.50°N 26.11°E
- Type: Lake
- Catchment area: Kymijoki
- Basin countries: Finland
- Surface area: 12.986 km^{2} (5.014 sq mi)
- Average depth: 6.6 m (22 ft)
- Max. depth: 30.2 m (99 ft)
- Water volume: 0.0856 km^{3} (69,400 acre⋅ft)
- Shore length^{1}: 53.24 km (33.08 mi)
- Surface elevation: 99.8 m (327 ft)
- Frozen: December–April
- Islands: Selkäsaaret, Myllysaari
- ^{1} Shore length is not a well-defined measure.

Uurainen is a medium-sized lake in Central Finland, on the border between the municipalities of Laukaa and Konnevesi. There is a large peninsula on the northern shore of the lake, which divides it into three long bays, called Äijälänlahti, Muikkulahti and Uuralahti. It is a popular lake among fishers due to its good capture possibilities.

== See also ==
- List of lakes in Finland
