= Rodrigo da Costa =

Rodrigo da Costa may refer to:

- Rodrigo da Costa (governor) (fl. 18th century), governor-general of the State of Brazil, a part of the Portuguese Empire; see Forte de São Lourenço § History
- Rodrigo (footballer, born August 1980) (Rodrigo Baldasso da Costa; born 1980), Brazilian football centre-back
- Rodrigo da Costa (footballer, born 1993) (Rodrigo Bandeira da Costa; born 1993), Brazilian football attacking midfielder
- Rodrigo (beach soccer) (Rodrigo da Costa; born 1993), Brazilian beach soccer player
- Rodrigo da Costa (engineer), executive director of the European Union Agency for the Space Programme (EUSPA)

== See also ==
- Rodrigo Costa (disambiguation)
