= Ville Tuppurainen =

Finnish Nordic combined skier (born 1988)

Ville Tuppurainen (born 18 June 1988 in Laukaa) is a Finnish Nordic combined skier from Laukaa, Finland. His best result in the World Cup is a 39th place.
