= Hannes Valkama =

Finnish clergyman and politician

Johannes (Hannes) Valkama (18 December 1876, Laukaa - 19 November 1952) was a Finnish Lutheran clergyman and politician. He was a member of the Parliament of Finland from 1924 to 1927, representing the National Progressive Party.
