= Lievestuore =

District of Laukaa, Central Finland Region, Finland

- Urban area
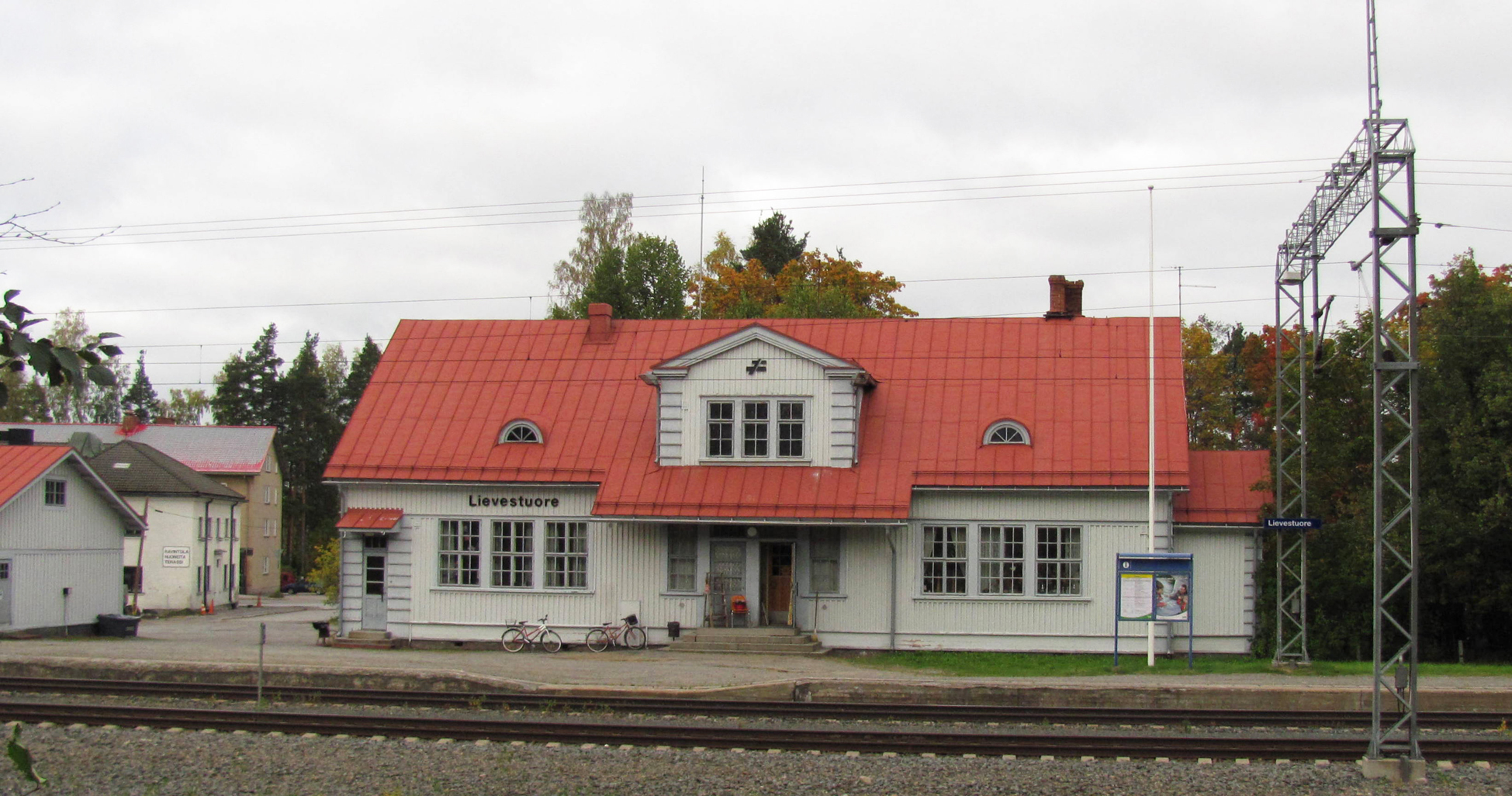
- Lievestuore railway station.

- Location in Central Finland
- Coordinates: 62.2625°N 26.2039°E
- Country: Finland
- Region: Central Finland
- Sub-region: Jyväskylä sub-region
- Municipality: Laukaa

Population (2020-12-31)
  - Total: 2,369
- Time zone: UTC+2 (EET)
  - Summer (DST): UTC+3 (EEST)

Lievestuore is an urban area (taajama) in Laukaa, Finland, located in the southeastern part of the municipality on the southern shore of lake Lievestuoreenjärvi. It is the third largest urban area and the most industrialized area in Laukaa. The Finnish national road 9 passes through Lievestuore and connects it to Jyväskylä, the distance between the two being 27 kilometres (17 mi).

At the end of 2020, Lievestuore had a population of 2,369 people, of whom 1,954 lived in central Lievestuore and 734 in the surrounding areas. Most houses in Lievestuore are detached houses or terraces, with a few apartments in the central area.

Lievestuoreen sellutehdas, a cellulose factory existed between 1927–1985.

== Naming and etymology ==
The meaning and origin of the name Lievestuore is unclear, as it consists of two unknown elements lieve(s)- and -tuore. The name is probably not of Finnish origin, possibly being derived from a Sámi language and morphed into a more "Finnish-sounding" form over time. The name originally referred to the lake and hunting grounds by it before being adopted as the settlement's name.

Distinct case forms may be used for the name: the adessive Liepeellä "in Lievestuore", ablative Liepeeltä "from Lievestuore" and allative Liepeelle "to Lievestuore"; these forms are nonstandard and may be seen as humorous.

== History ==
=== Early history ===
Before the area was settled in the 16th century, the shores of the Lievestuoreenjärvi were hunting grounds of Tuulos, specifically the villages of Juttila and Toivaala. In 1560, a Savonian named Paavali Puttonen had settled on the hunting grounds of Toivaala, establishing the Naaranputtola farm. A leasehold estate (lampuotitila) on the lands of Juttila was first mentioned in 1564, when it was leased to Markku Jussinpoika. This farm was abandoned in 1571. The Porkkala manor of Lammi also had a leased estate in the area since 1565, which was named Markkula at the end of the century.

Initially the official village of Lievestuore included all farms around the lake, but Naarantaipale and Puttola (split from the former in 1571) were eventually transferred to the village of Leppävesi, though they were also mentioned as part of Niemisjärvi in 1579. However, three leasehold farms owned by the Skytte family; Leivonniemi (Simuna), Rusila (in modern Hankasalmi) and Taipale (Hytölä, in modern Sumiainen) were transferred to Lievestuore, thus forming a very discontinuous official village consisting only of leasehold estates. In 1611, the farm abandoned in 1571 was reestablished as Montola after its new leaseholder Jussi Montonen. The farm was leased to the Montonen family until the 1670s, then to the Valkonen family. The Saarilampi farm was separated from Montola in 1771. Montola had become a crown farm (kruununtila, that was property of the crown and not of nobles) in 1694.

The village of Lievestuore comprised five divisions (jakokunta) in 1776: Markkula, Montola, Rusila, Simuna and Hytölä. During the Great Partition, the discontinuous official village was noted as ineffective to administer. In 1829, Simuna was transferred to Kapeekoski, Rusila to Niemisjärvi and Hytölä to Sumiainen, while the farms of Kangas-Naaranputtola on the northern shore of Lievestuoreenjärvi were transferred from Leppävesi to Lievestuore per request of the area's inhabitants. Kangas-Naaranputtola included an external territory called Hohonmaa on the southern shore of the lake, which was deemed unsuitable for farming and became crown land.

=== Industrialization ===
Before industrialization, Lievestuore referred to the entire official village around the lake, while the site of the modern urban area of Lievestuore was called Hoho after the Hohonmaa territory. The development of the modern area began with the establishment of small farms on the state-owned Hohonmaa. The construction of the Jyväskylä–Pieksämäki railway, which would pass through Lievestuore, began in September 1913. A postal stop was established by the railroad in 1914 and was expanded into a post office in 1919. Lievestuore acquired a proper station in 1929 after the old Humaljoki station was relocated there from the Karelian Isthmus.

The Lievestuore pulp mill was established in 1927 by Rafael Haarla, who already owned a paper mill in Tampere. While the mill had helped the village grow significantly, pollution was becoming an issue. By 1934, the Lievestuoreenjärvi had become polluted, making it harder for the factory to acquire clean water. Waste water was later emptied into the nearby Koivusuo swamp, causing a pond called Lipeälampi to appear.

From 1921 to 1922, there were plans to establish a separate Lievestuore parish, as the distance from Lievestuore and Hoho to the church of Laukaa could be as long as 30 km. The idea of a separate Lievestuore parish and municipality was revived in March 1936. The municipality was also planned to include parts of Hankasalmi, Toivakka, Kangasniemi and Jyväskylän maalaiskunta and cover a territory with a total population of 4,851. The plan was abandoned after Rafael Haarla's death in 1938 and the start of the Winter War in 1939, though it was brought up again for some time in the 1960s and later in the 1980s.

The pulp mill was closed in June 1967, but was reopened by Sahateollisuuden Sivutuoteyhdistys (Sivutuote Oy) in 1971, only to be closed again due to its effects on the environment. The employees kept working in the factory without permission for some time. Production began again in 1974 and the factory was modernized in 1976. The pulp mill was finally closed in 1985 after the company had forged water samples and went bankrupt.

== Services ==
Lievestuore has a school, a day care center, a youth center, a health center and a pharmacy, a church, a pub, a restaurant and a grocery store.

== Church ==
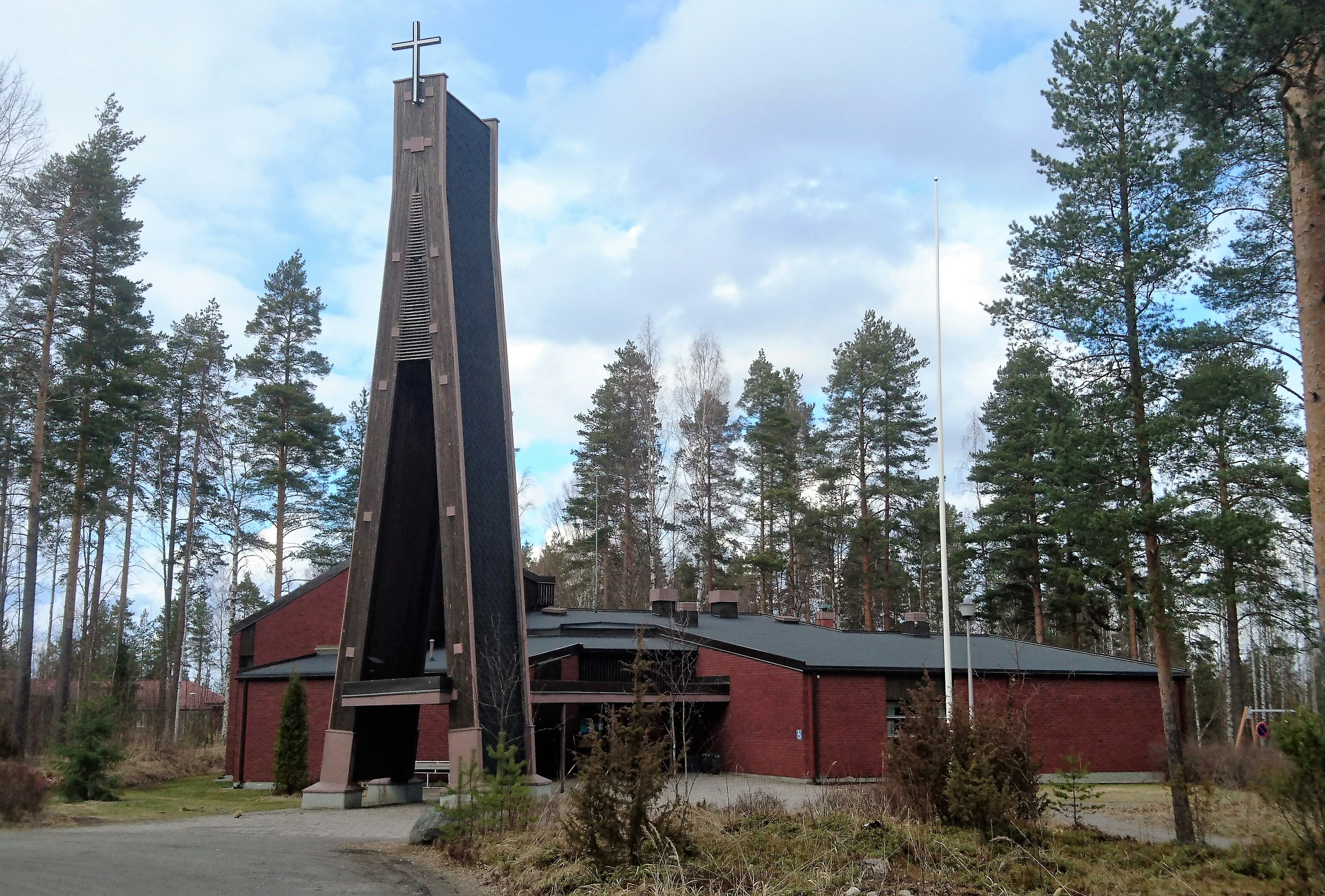
The church of Lievestuore.

Since 1950, a congregation hall on lands rented by the parish of Laukaa had acted as a church for the people of Lievestuore. A decision to build a proper church was made in September 1979 as the congregation hall had become too small and construction began in May 1982. The church was finished and consecrated in March 1983. It has seats for 130 attendants.

== Famous natives ==
- Sylvi Saimo, sprint canoeist

== Gallery ==
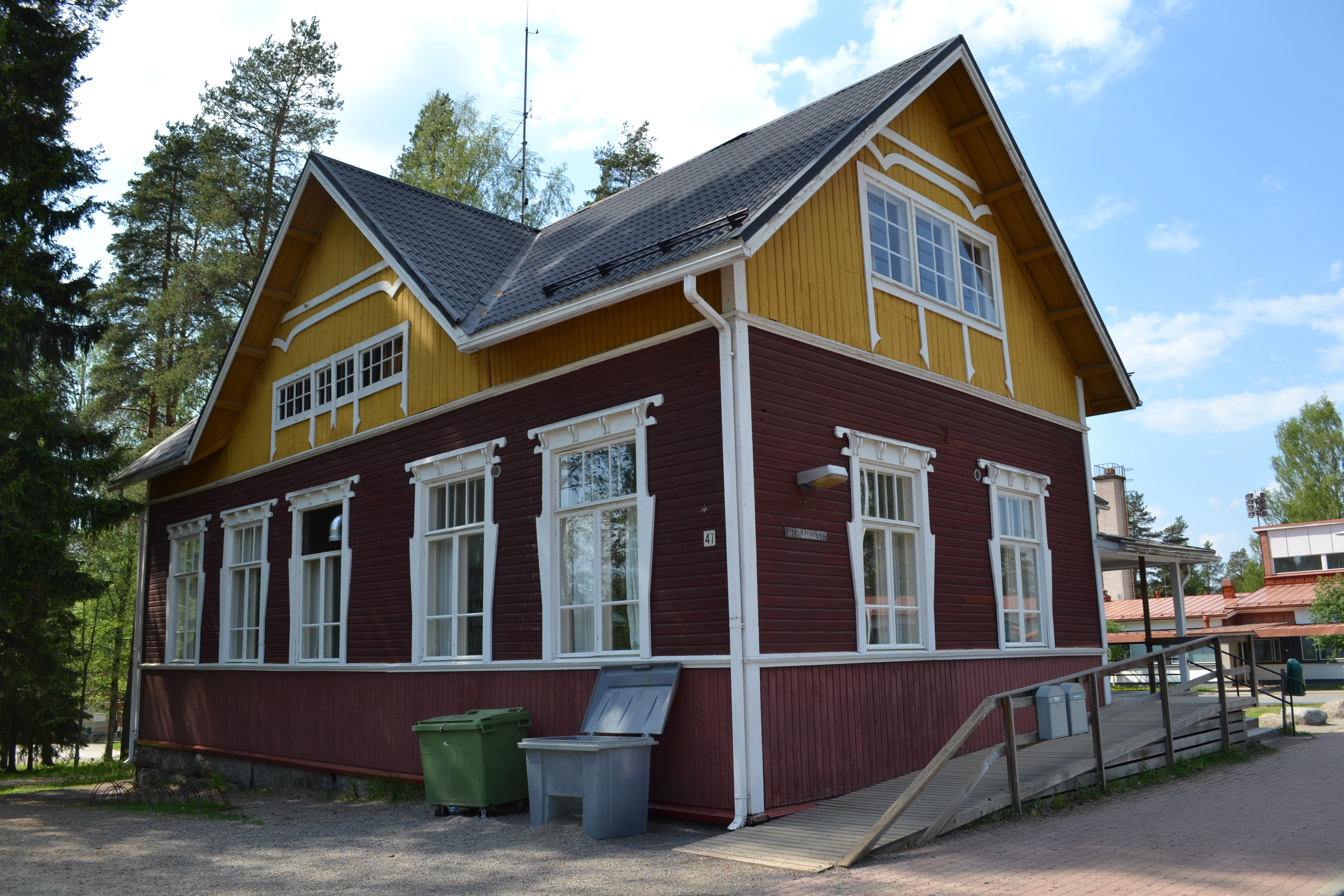
Old Library, now a residential building.

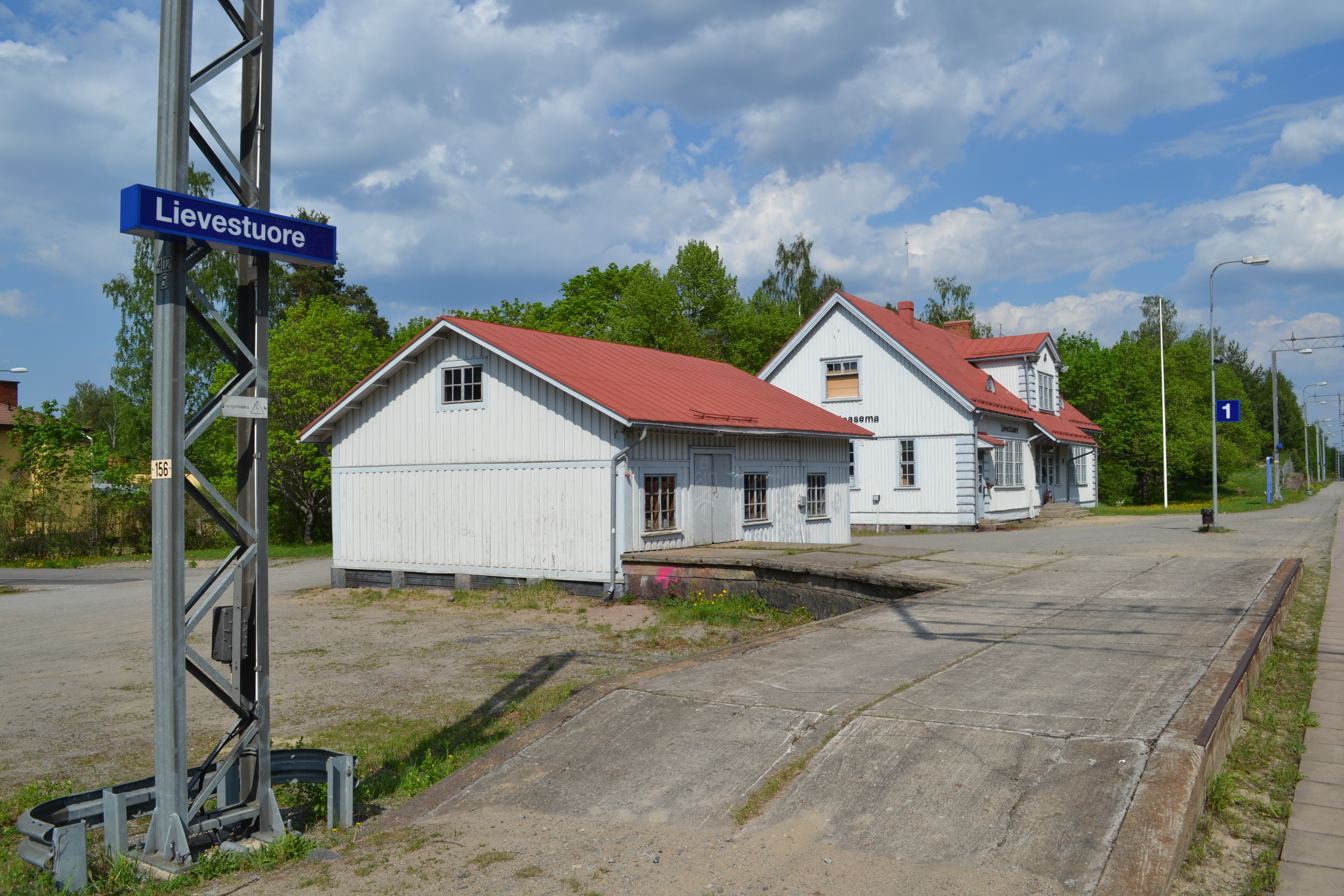
Railway station

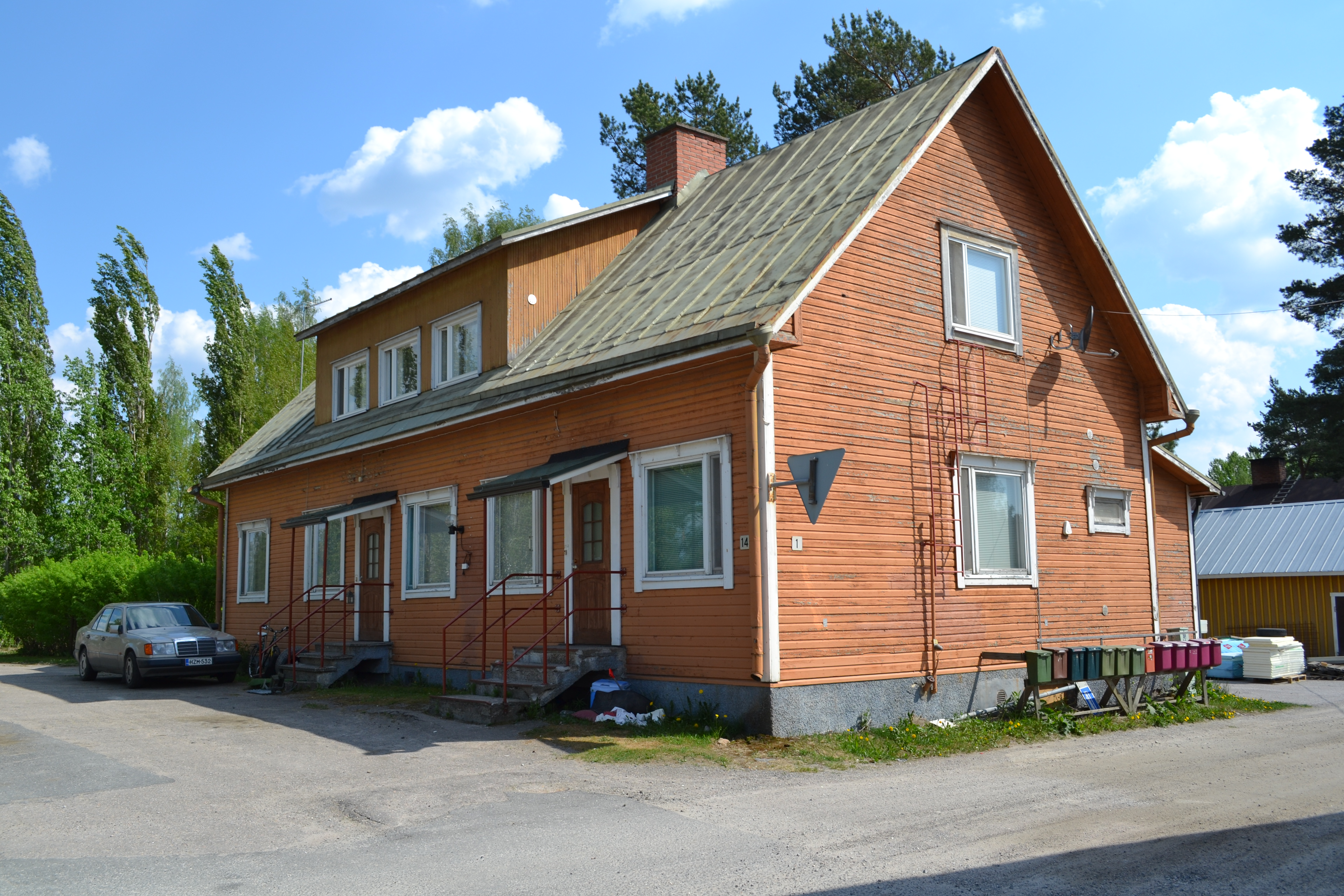
House in Lievestuore

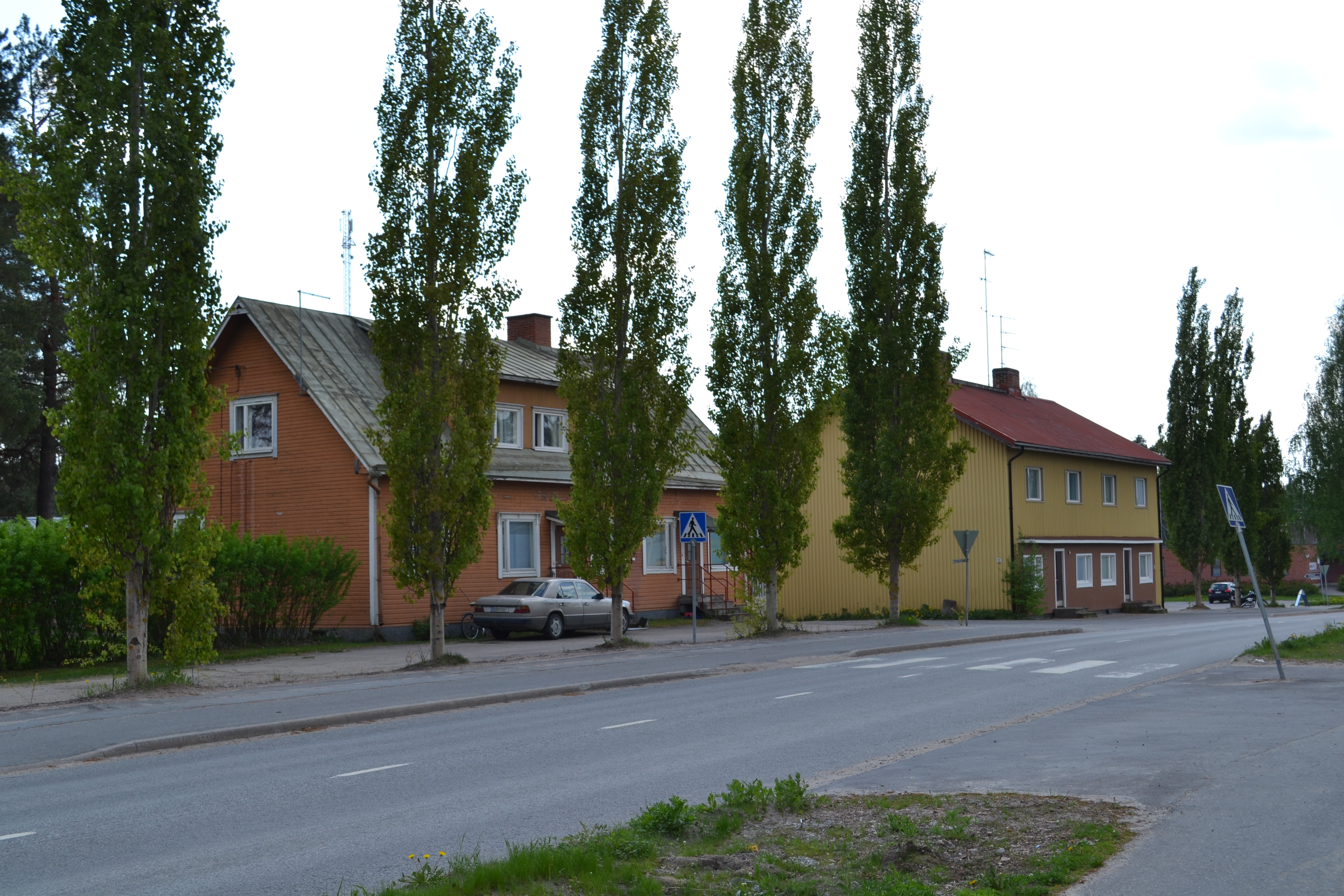
A centrum view

== See also ==
- Lievestuoreenjärvi
- Nokkakivi – amusement park in Lievestuore
