= Tykkimäki =

Amusement park in Kouvola, Finland

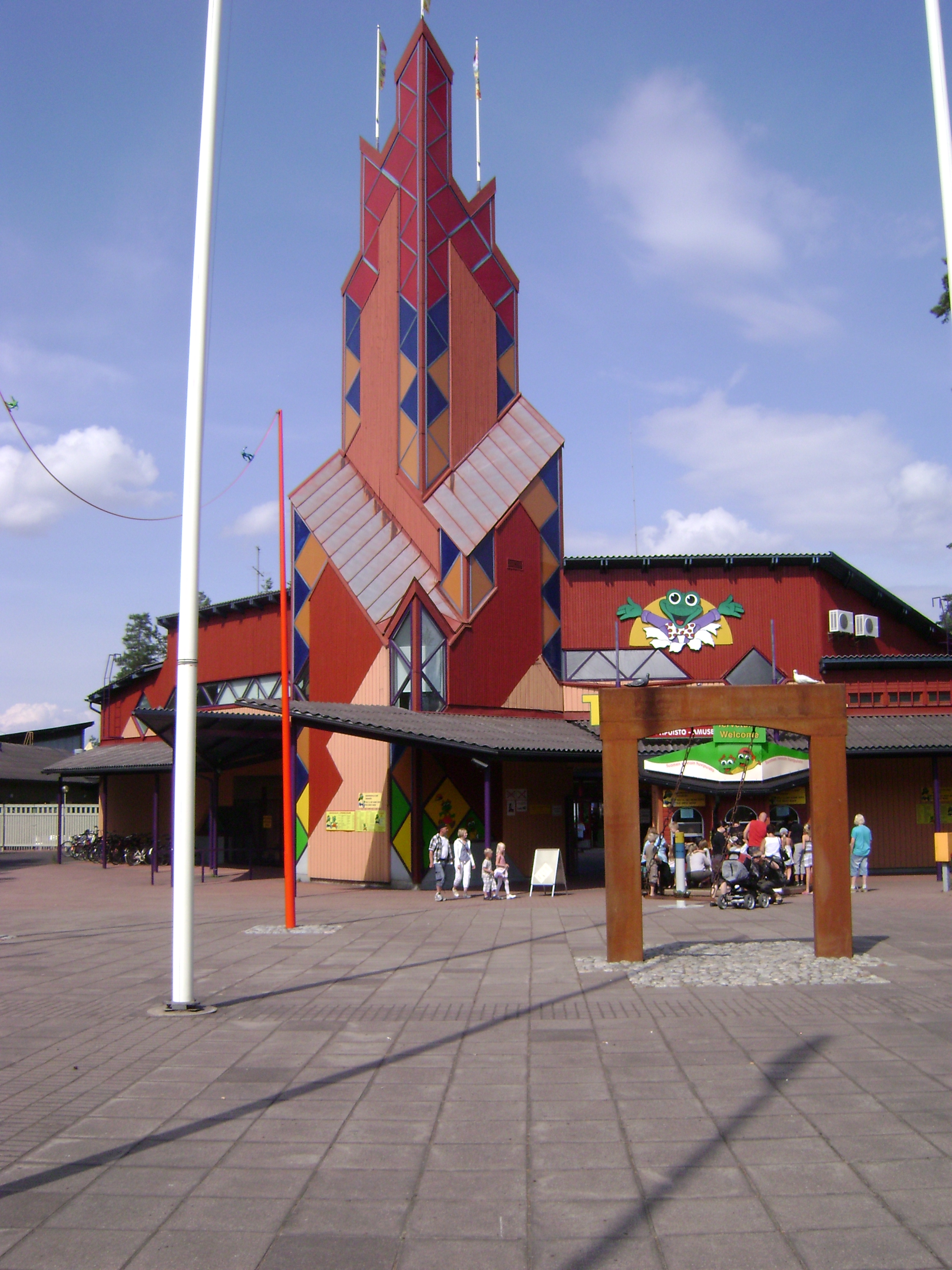
- Interactive map of Tykkimäki
- Location: Kanuunakuja 2, 45200 Kouvola, Finland
- Coordinates: 60°53′05″N 26°46′32″E
- Status: Operating
- Opened: 1986
- Owner: Tykkimäen Vapaa-aikakeskus Oy
- Operating season: May to August
- Area: 65.000 m^{2} (699.65 sq ft)

Attractions
- Total: 33
- Roller coasters: 1
- Water rides: 2
- Website: www.tykkimaki.fi

Tykkimäen moottorirata
Cannon Hill
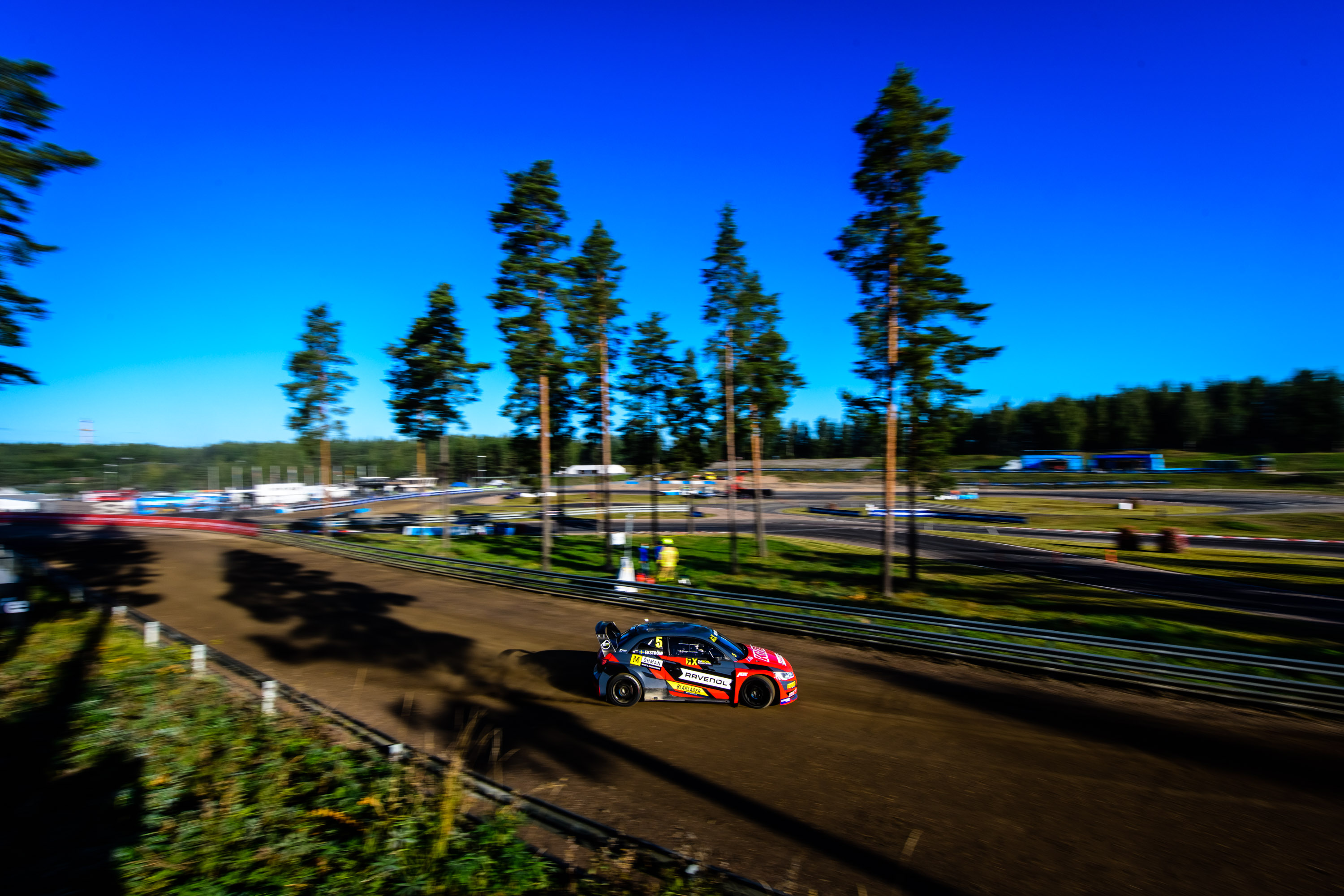
- View of Tykkimäki motor track
- Location: Tehontie 51, 45200 Kouvola, Finland
- Opened: 1970s
- Major events: Folkrace, Crosskart, Rallycross, Drifting, Motocross, Enduro and Tractor pulling
- Website: http://www.tykkimaki.fi/en/

Tykkimäki (lit. 'Cannon Hill') is an amusement park in Kouvola, Finland. It has 30 different rides, along with some restaurants and kiosks. A camping site and Lake Käyrälampi are located near Tykkimäki.

The park opened in 1986 and is operated by the Children's Day Foundation. Many of Tykkimäki's rides are preowned rides bought from other parks, most often from Linnanmäki or Särkänniemi. The latest ride relocation happened in 2007, when Tykkimäki opened the Kouvola-pyörä Ferris wheel, which had been at Linnanmäki over 40 years.

== Rides and attractions ==
=== Major rides ===
| Name | Manufacturer | Model | Opened | Ride type |
|---|---|---|---|---|
| Autorata | Sartori | | 1986 (renewed 2004) | Bumper cars |
| Calypso | Schwarzkopf | Calypso II | 1986 | Thrill ride |
| Endeavour | Zamperla | Endeavour | 2018 | Thrill ride |
| Horisontti | SBF Visa Group | | 2024 | Drop tower |
| Kouvola-pyörä | | | 2007 | Ferris wheel |
| Loop Fighter | Technical Park | Loop Fighter | 2012 | Thrill ride |
| Pilvenpyörä | Frank Hrubetz | | 1988 | Paratrooper |
| Pohjola Express | SBF Visa Group | Ultra Family Coaster | 2026 | Roller coaster |
| Star Flyer | Funtime | Starflyer | 2009 | Starflyer |
| Trombi | Zamperla | Disk'O | 2005 | Thrill ride |

=== Family rides ===
| Name | Manufacturer | Model | Opened | Ride type |
|---|---|---|---|---|
| Kummitusjuna | Rex Studios, C&S (cars) | | 2002 | Dark ride |
| Keinukaruselli | Zamperla | | 1996 | Swings |

=== Kiddie rides ===
| Name | Manufacturer | Model | Opened | Ride type |
|---|---|---|---|---|
| Apollo | | | 1998 | Carousel |
| Hully Gully | Sartori | | 1986 | Carousel |
| Meteoriitti | Modern Products | | 2004 | Carousel |

=== Attractions ===
| Name | Manufacturer | Model | Opened | Ride type |
|---|---|---|---|---|
| Mysteerio | Tykkimäki | | 1997 | |
| Yllätysten talo | Tykkimäki | | 1986 | Fun house |

=== Removed rides ===
| Name | Manufacturer | Model | Opened | Removed | Ride type |
|---|---|---|---|---|---|
| Cortina-Jet | Schwarzkopf | Bayern Curve | 1988 | 2006 | Thrill ride |
| Disco Jet | | | 1995 | 1998 | Carousel |
| Idän pikajuna | MACK | Blauer Enzian | 1989 | 2025 | Roller coaster |
| Naurutalo | Tykkimäki | | 1986 | 2005 | House of mirrors |
| Round Up | Nijmeegs Lasbedrijf | | 1986 | 2002 | Round Up |
| Sokkelo | Tykkimäki | | 1986 | 2001 | Glass maze |
| Taifun | Schwarzkopf | Condor (ride) | 1986 | 2023 | Thrill ride |
| Enterprise | Schwarzkopf | enterprise | 1986 | 2017 | Enterprise |
| Suihkio | Kaspar Klaus | Roto-Jet | 1986 | 2011 | Carousel |

== Rides that operated at Tykkimäki ==
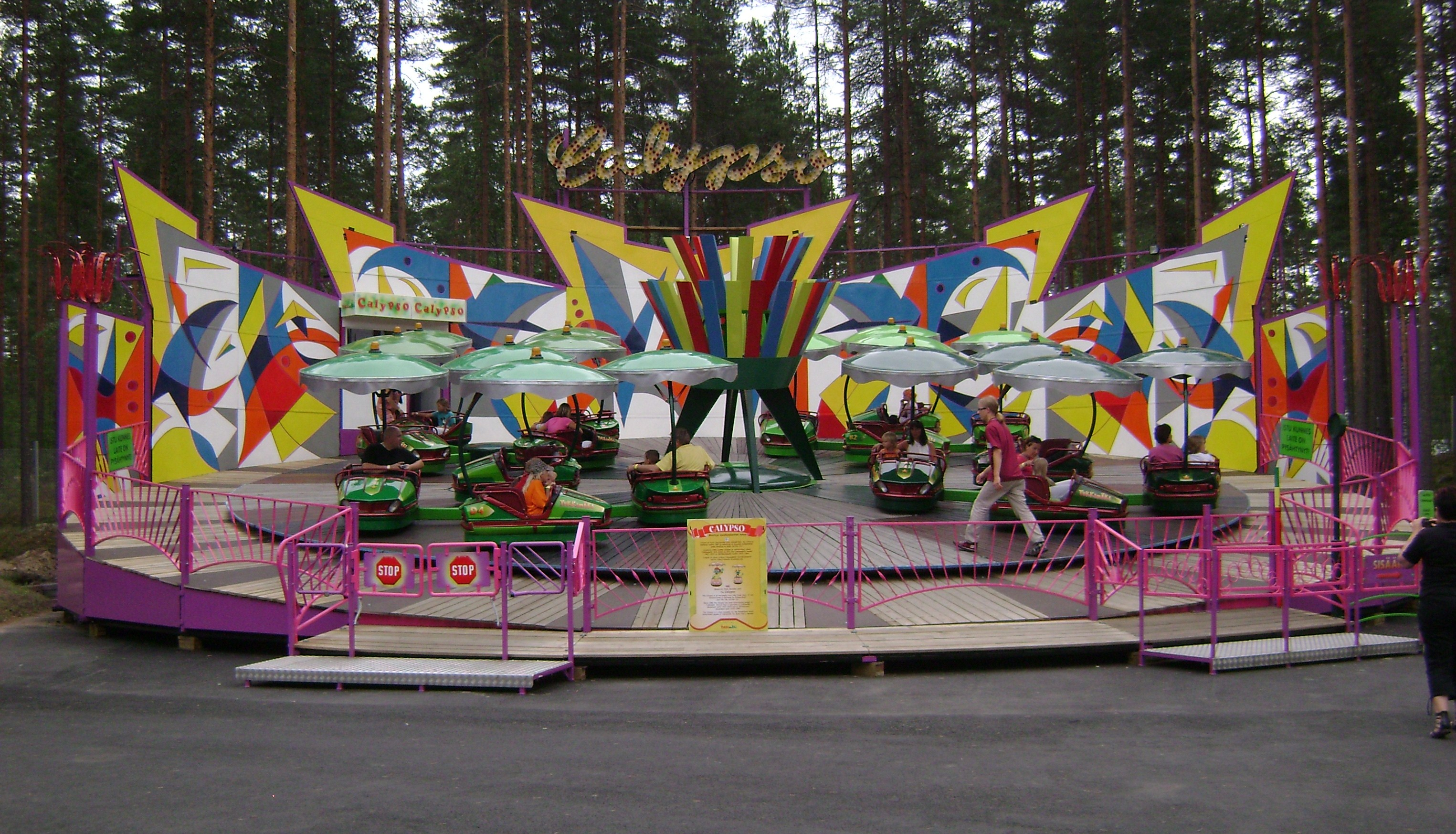
Calypso (1986–)

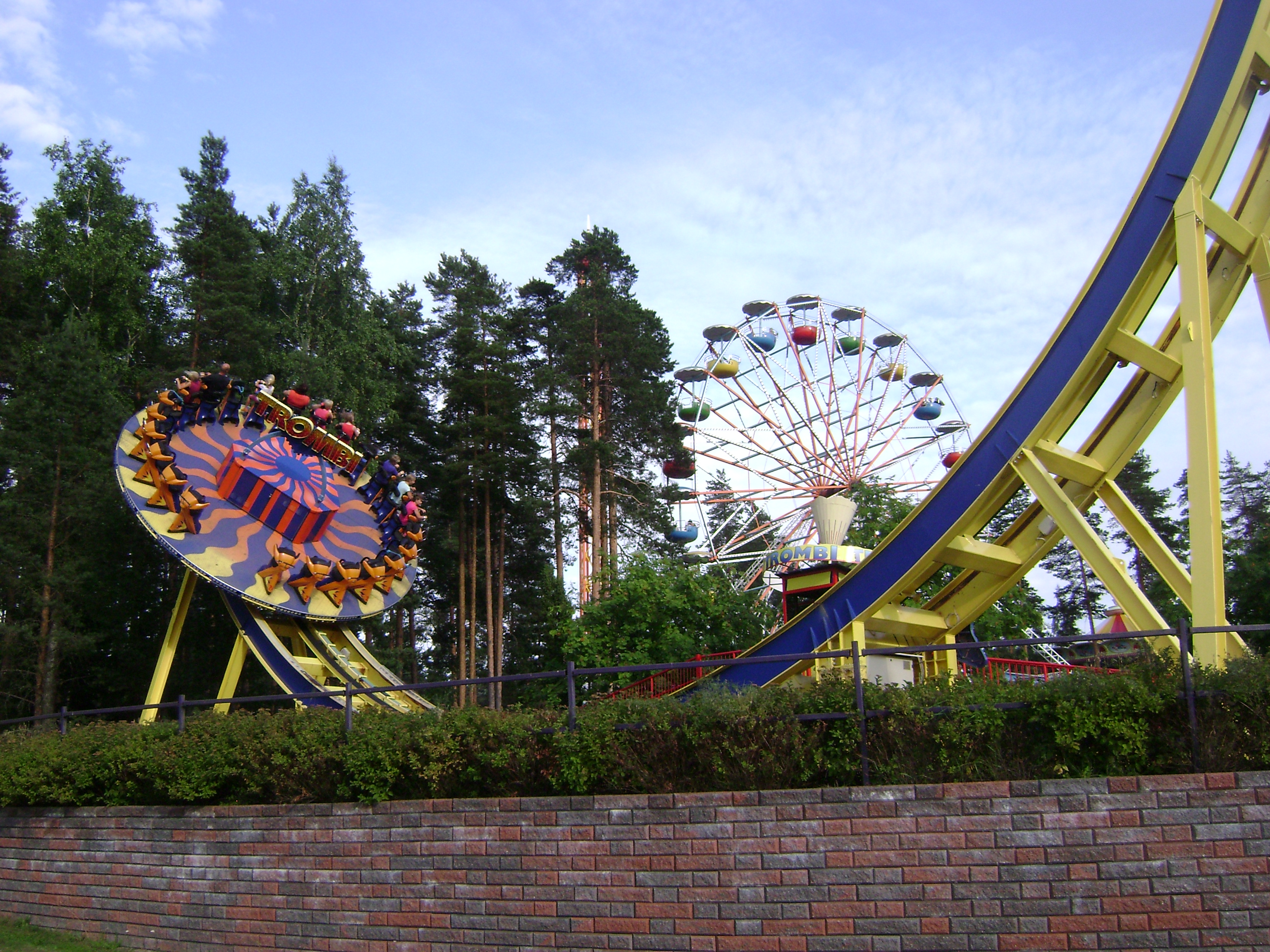
Trombi and Kouvola's Ferris Wheel

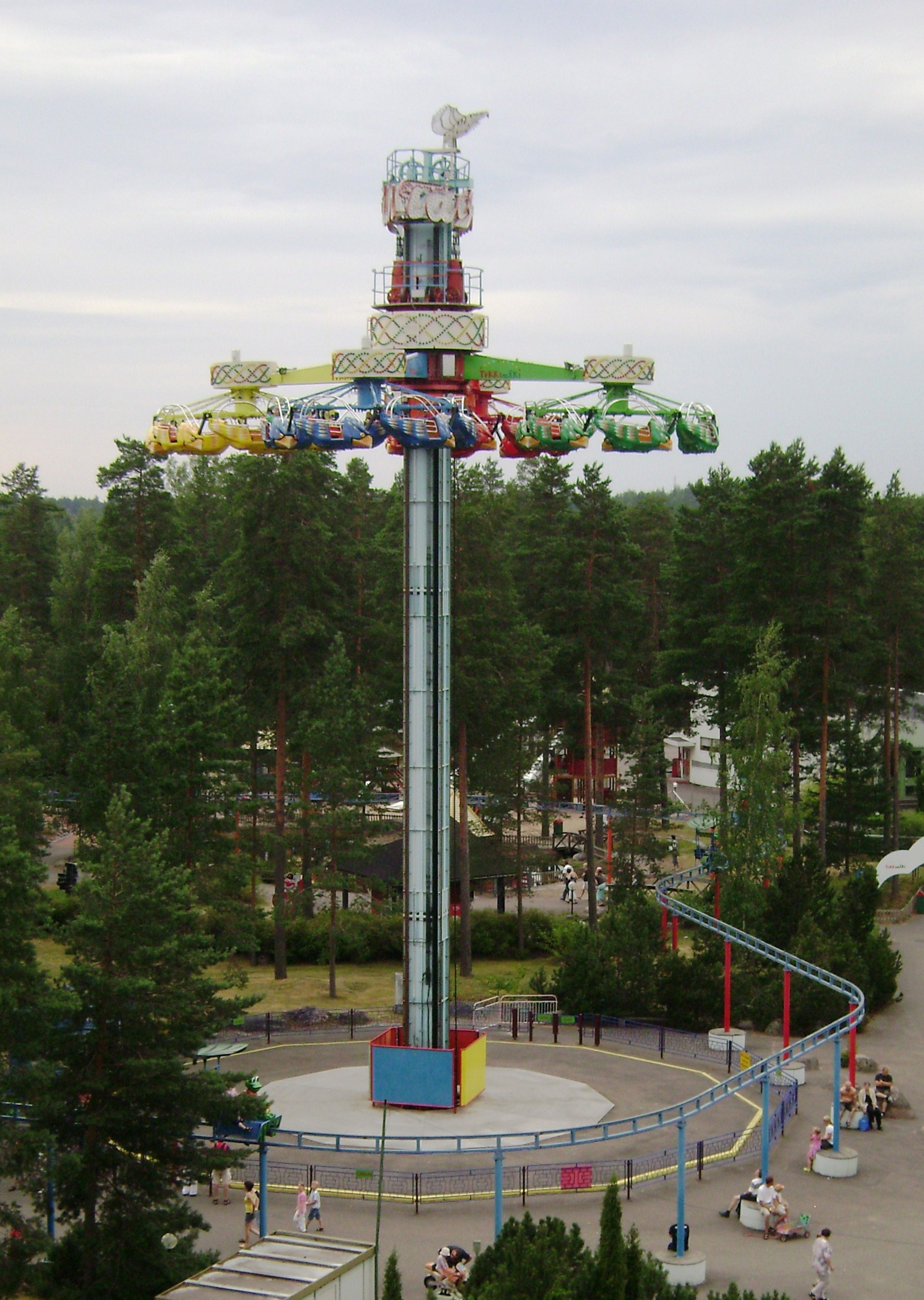
Taifun (1986-2023)

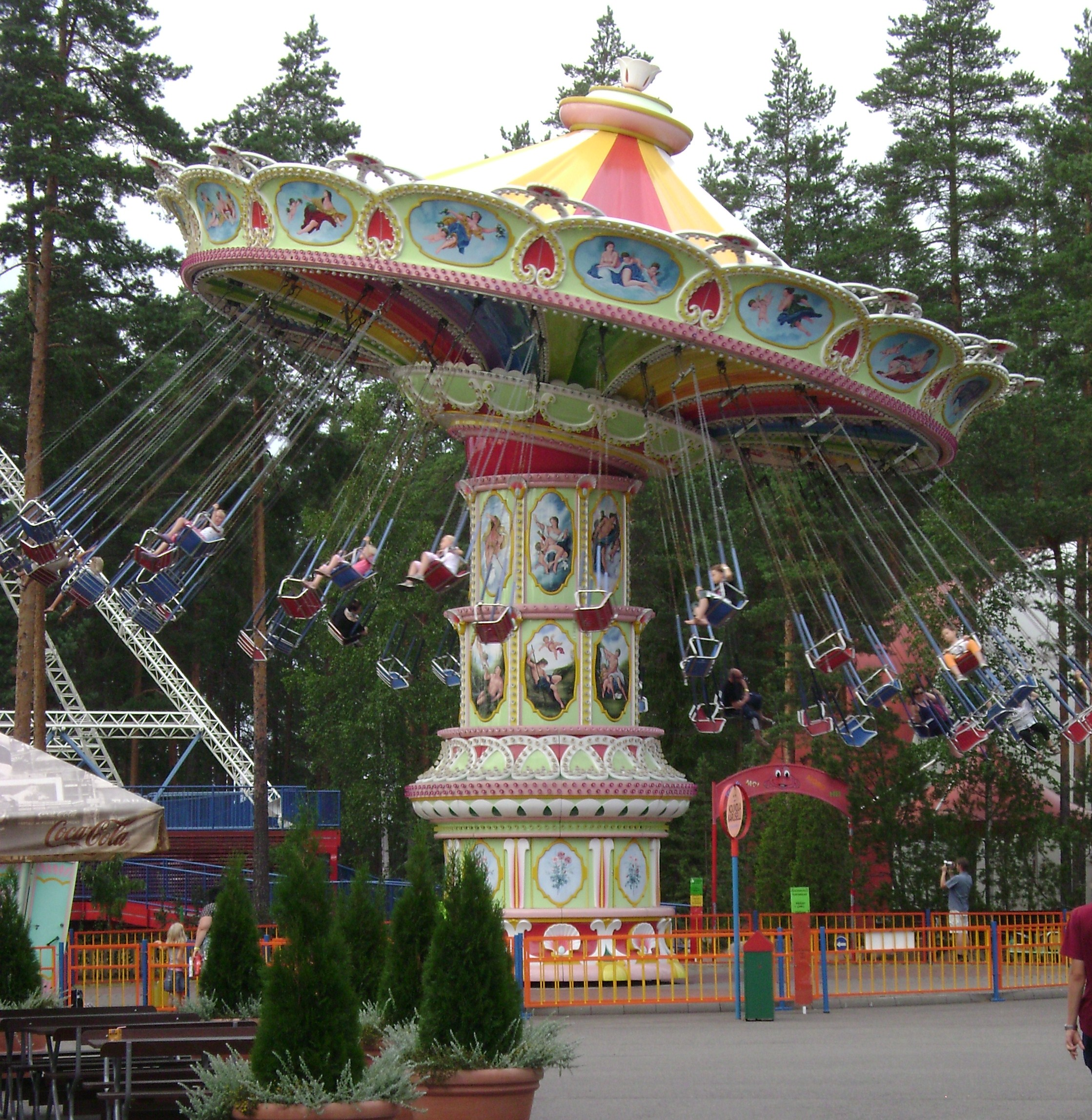
Keinukaruselli (1996-)

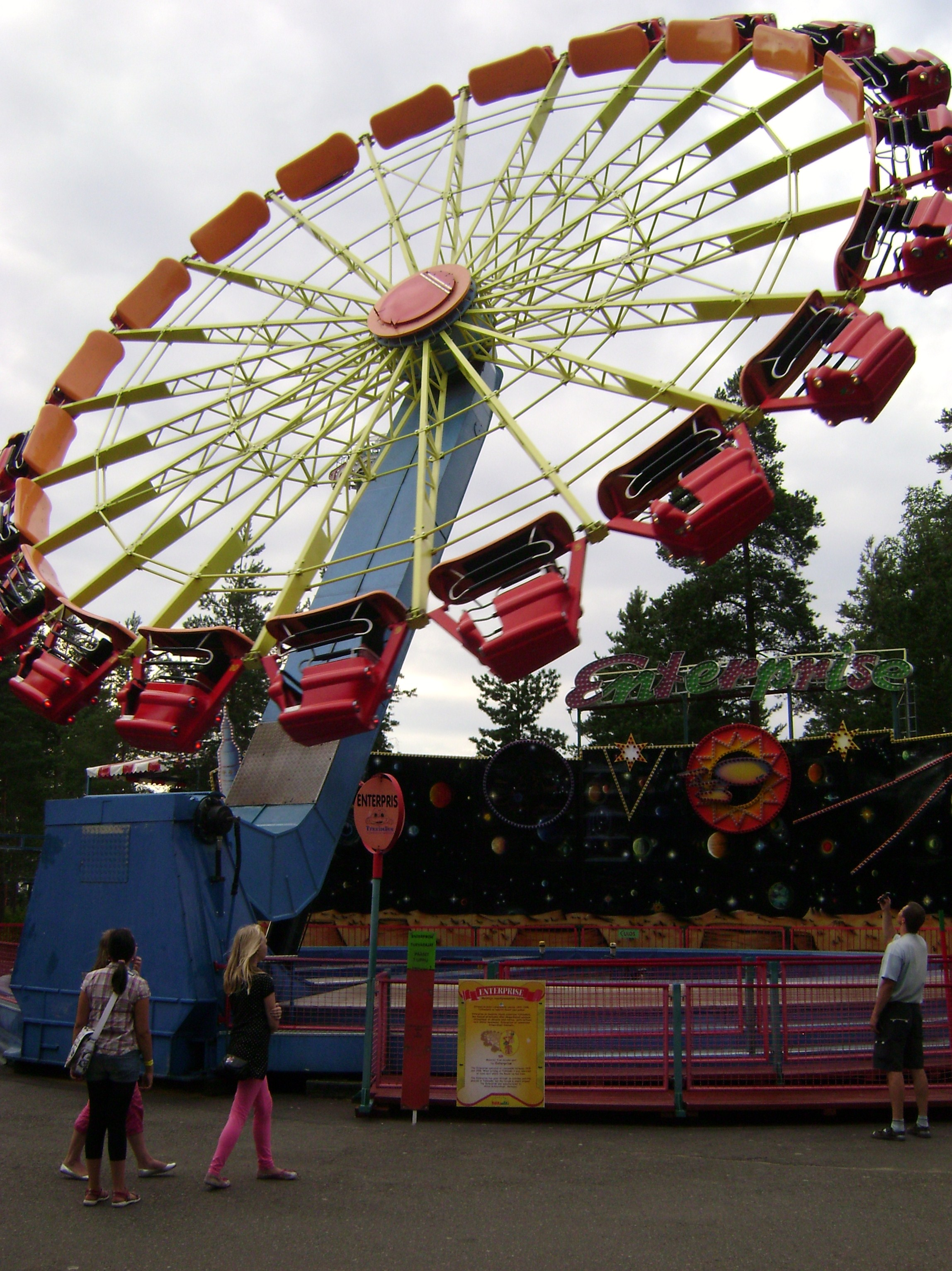
Enterprise (1999–2017)

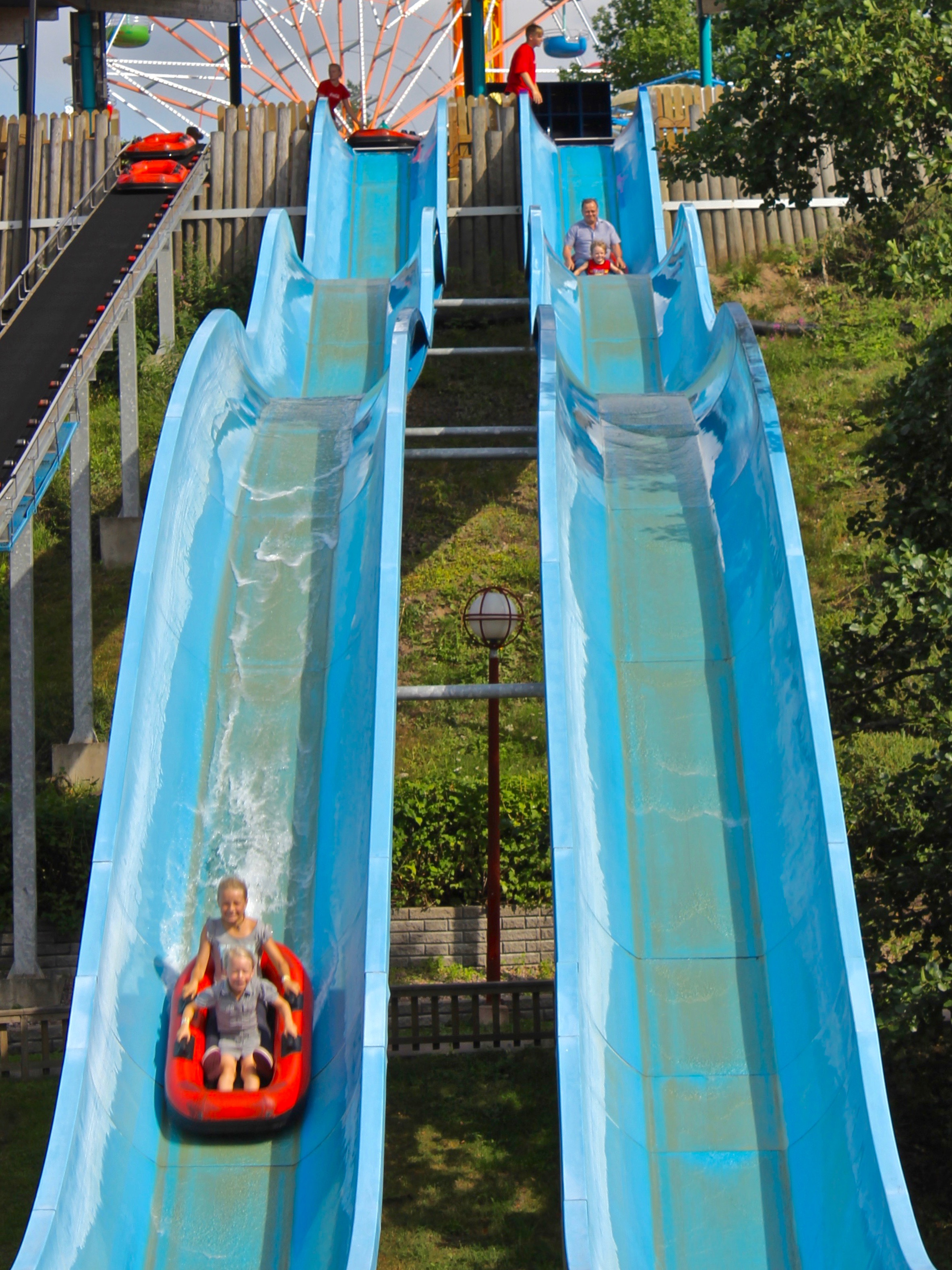
Vesiliukumäki (2001–)

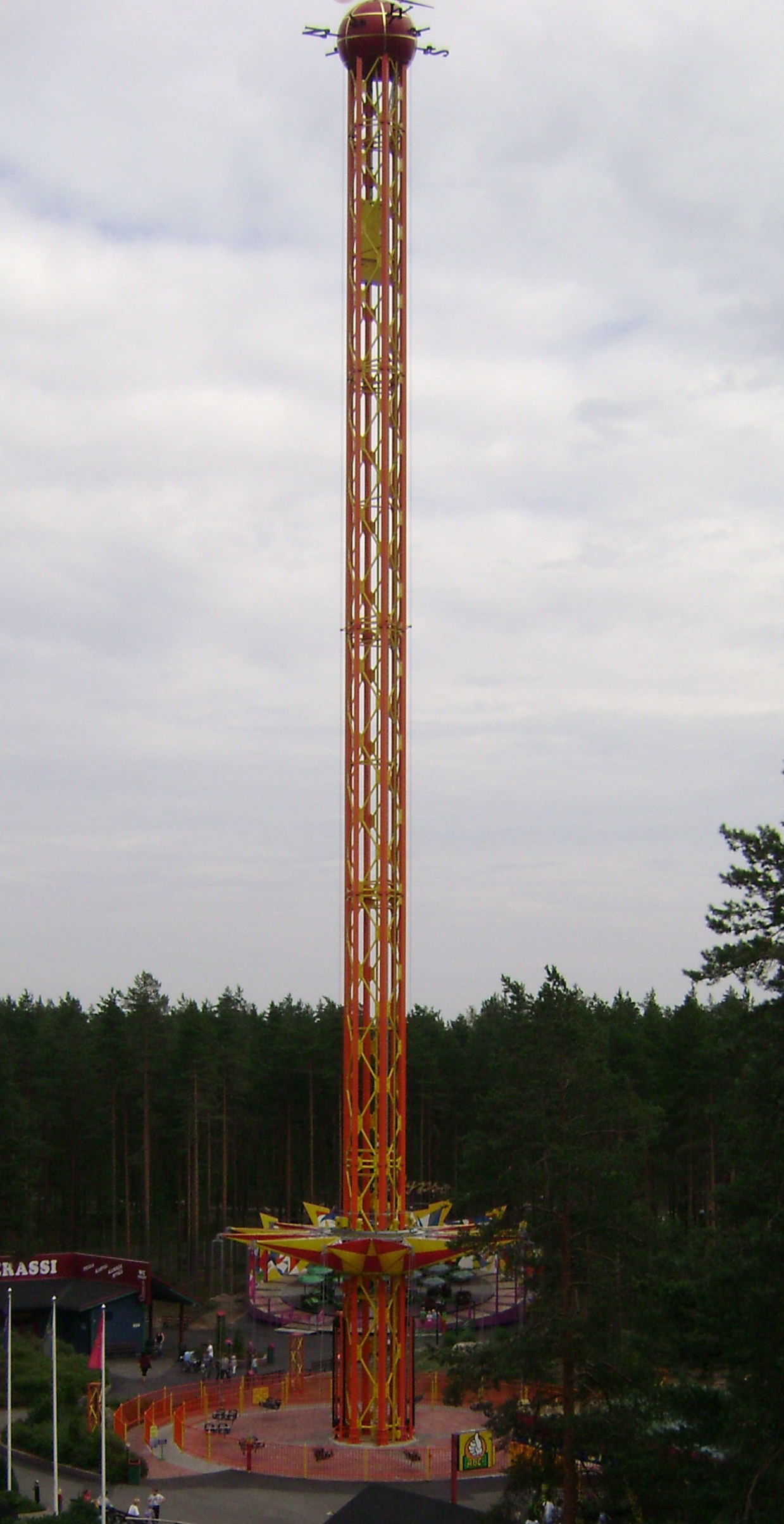
Star Flyer (2009–)
