= Lievestuoreenjärvi =

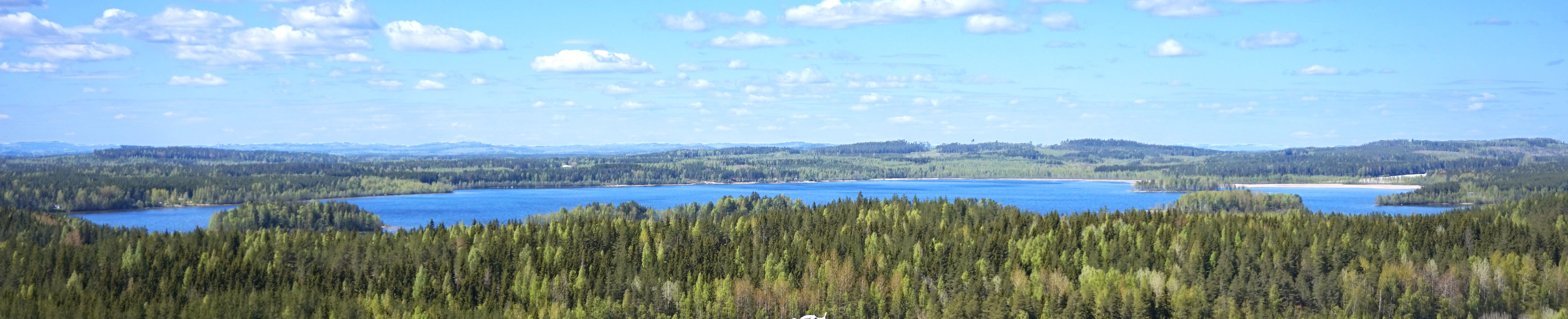

- Location in Finland
- Location: Laukaa
- Coordinates: 62°19′N 026°09′E
- Type: Lake
- Primary inflows: Hohonjoki
- Primary outflows: Sahinjoki
- Catchment area: Kymijoki
- Basin countries: Finland
- Surface area: 40.52 km^{2} (15.64 sq mi)
- Average depth: 9.91 m (32.5 ft)
- Max. depth: 70 m (230 ft)
- Water volume: 0.4 km^{3} (320,000 acre⋅ft)
- Shore length^{1}: 107.4 km (66.7 mi)
- Surface elevation: 84.9 m (279 ft)
- Frozen: December–April
- Islands: Kirvessaari, Pukkisaari, Lamposaari, Kieräsaari
- Settlements: Laukaa
- ^{1} Shore length is not a well-defined measure.

Lievestuoreenjärvi (Finnish: ['lie̯ʋestuo̯reːnˌjærʋi]) is a medium-sized lake in the municipality of Laukaa, Finland. On the southern shore of the lake lies Lievestuore village. On the eastern side of the lake there is Hyyppäänvuori hill, which forms a Natura 2000 protection area. The hill in valuable because of its scenic rocky views and offers attractive views of the lake.

== See also ==
- List of lakes in Finland
