= Laukaa =

Laukaa Laukas
- Municipality
- Laukaan kunta Laukas kommun
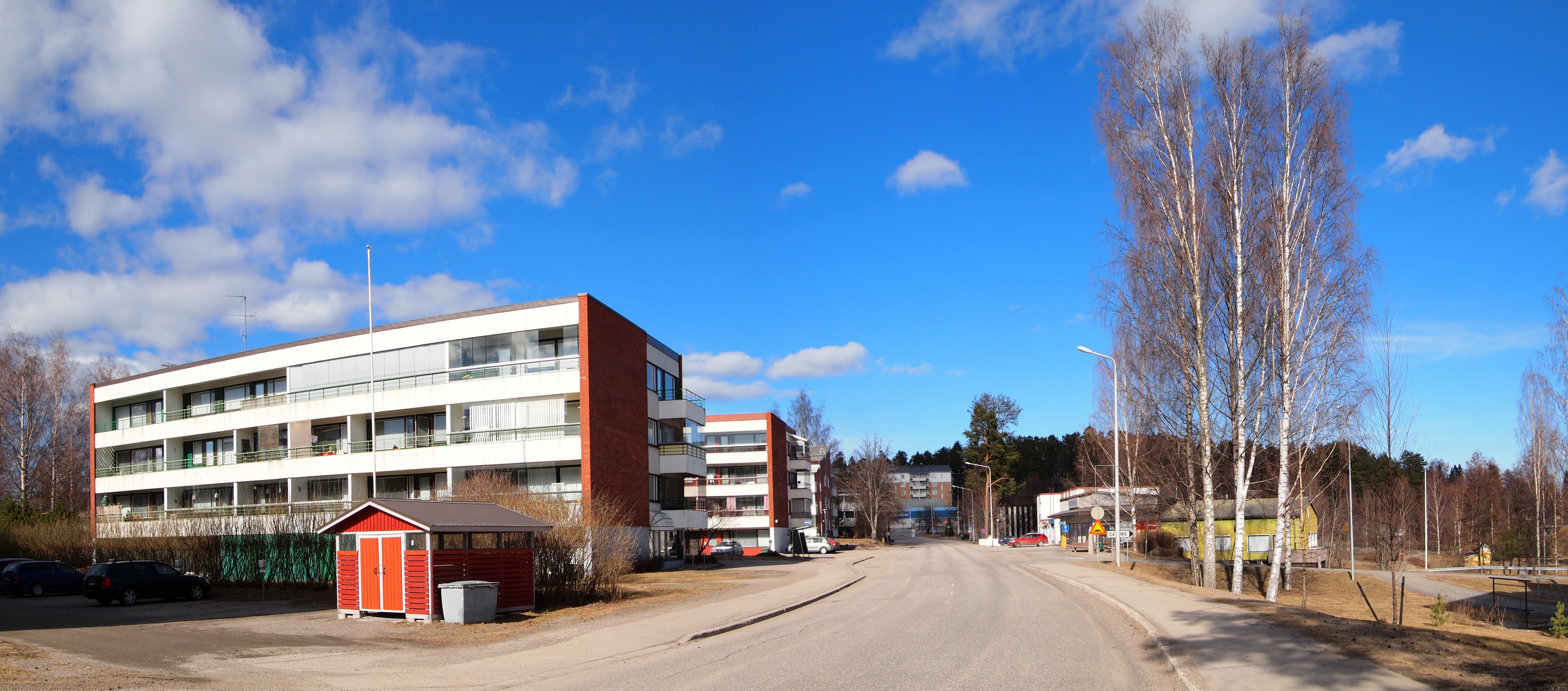

- Coat of arms

- Location of Laukaa in Finland
- Interactive map of Laukaa
- Coordinates: 62°25′N 025°57′E
- Country: Finland
- Region: Central Finland
- Sub-region: Jyväskylä
- Charter: 1593
- Seat: Laukaan kirkonkylä
- Villages: Leppävesi, Lievestuore, Vihtavuori

Government
  - Municipal manager: Linda Leinonen

Area (2018-01-01)
  - Total: 825.59 km^{2} (318.76 sq mi)
  - Land: 648.51 km^{2} (250.39 sq mi)
  - Water: 177.09 km^{2} (68.37 sq mi)
  - Rank: 133rd largest in Finland

Population (2025-12-31)
  - Total: 18,808
  - Rank: 63rd largest in Finland
  - Density: 29/km^{2} (75/sq mi)

Population by native language
  - Finnish: 97.5% (official)
  - Swedish: 0.1%
  - Others: 2.4%

Population by age
  - 0 to 14: 22.2%
  - 15 to 64: 57.3%
  - 65 or older: 20.6%
- Time zone: UTC+02:00 (EET)
  - Summer (DST): UTC+03:00 (EEST)
- Website: www.laukaa.fi/en/

Laukaa (Finnish: [ˈlɑu̯kɑː]; Swedish: Laukas) is a municipality of Finland. It is located next to Jyväskylä and is part of the Central Finland region. The municipality has a population of 18,808 (31 December 2025) and covers an area of 825.59 square kilometres (318.76 sq mi) of which 177.09 km^{2} (68.37 sq mi) is water. The population density is 29 inhabitants per square kilometre (75/sq mi).

The municipality is unilingually Finnish.

The subject of Laukaa's coat of arms refers to the municipality's abundant coniferous forests and Laukaa's location in the heart of Finland. The explanation of the coat of arms is "a red heart in a silver field, from which grows a three-pronged green conifer." The coat of arms was designed by Olof Eriksson and approved by the Laukaa Municipal Council at its meeting on June 6, 1955. The Ministry of the Interior confirmed the use of the coat of arms on September 5 of the same year.

== Geography ==
Neighbouring municipalities are Hankasalmi, Jyväskylä, Konnevesi, Toivakka, Uurainen and Äänekoski.

There are all together 129 lakes in Laukaa. Biggest lakes in Laukaa are Lievestuoreenjärvi, Kuusvesi, Leppävesi and Lake Uurainen.

=== Villages ===
- Hoho
- Kuhaniemi (or Kuhankoski)
- Kuusa (or Kuusaa)
- Lankamaa
- Leinola
- Leppävesi
- Lievestuore
- Metsolahti
- Saarilampi
- Savio
- Simuna
- Tarvaala
- Tervatehdas
- Tiituspohja
- Valkola
- Vehniä
- Vihtasilta
- Vihtavuori
- Vuontee
- Äijälä

== History ==
The name of Laukaa likely comes from the now obsolete word lauas (genitive: laukaan), stream pool, in this case referring to the Koivulahti bay in the lake Saraavesi. The name is also related to that of the river Luga in Russia (Votic: Laugaz), albeit only through the word from which the names are derived.

The area of Laukaa was an important route to both the lake Keitele in the northwest and Rautalampi in the northeast. Laukaa itself was a part of the Rautalampi parish, gaining its first subordinate church in 1593. This church was located near modern Tarvaala (aka Laukkavirta), which was therefore the original center of Laukaa. The center shifted to the modern location in Pellosniemi sometime in the 17th century.

Laukaa became a separate parish in 1628. It included Saarijärvi until 1639, Jyväskylä until 1837, Jyväskylän mlk (to which Toivakka was moved in 1871) and Sumiainen until 1868 and Äänekosken mlk until 1907 (administratively 1911).

== Saraakallio Stone Age rock paintings ==
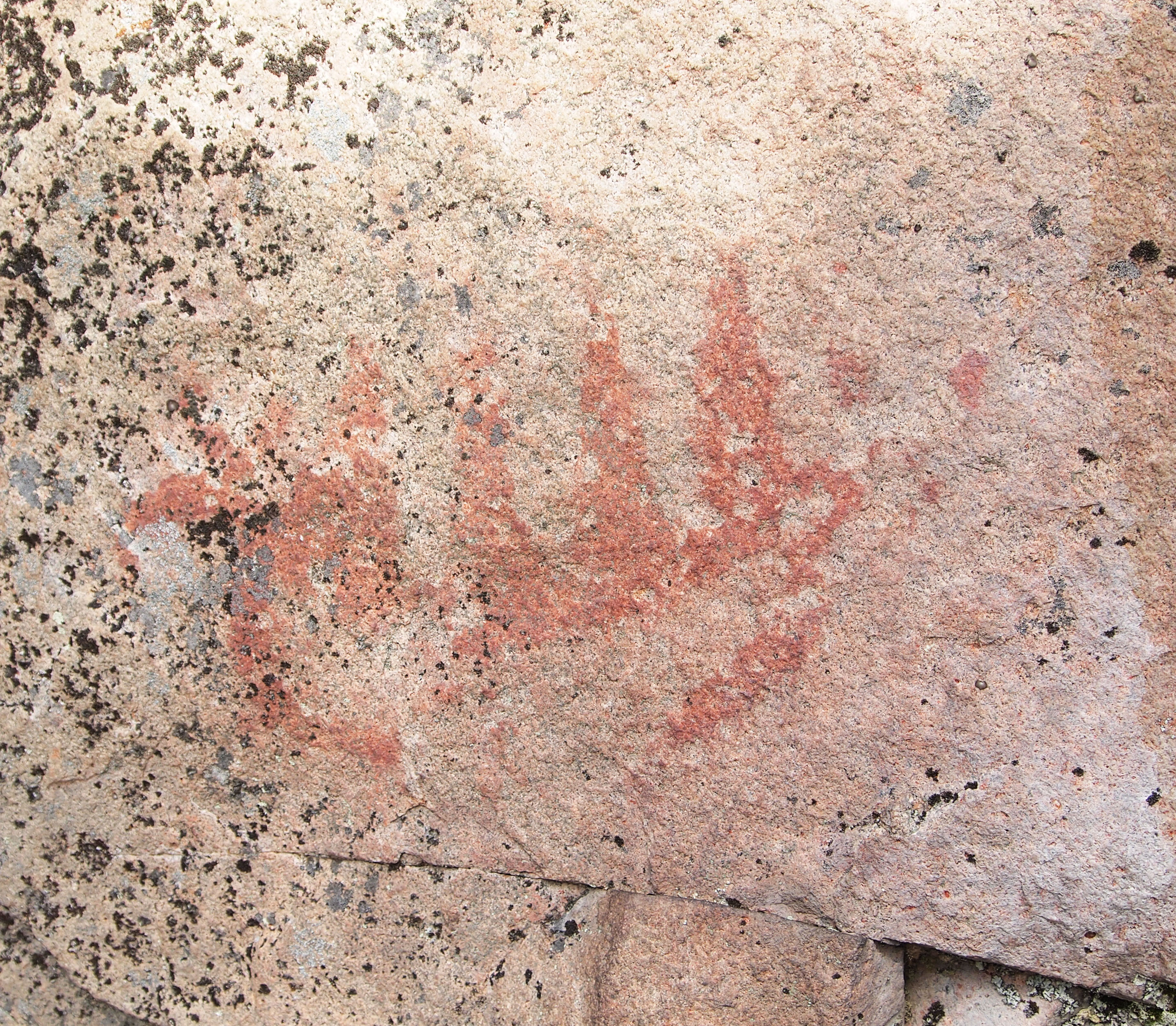
A rock painting in Saraakallio

Saraakallio, the largest Stone Age rock painting site of Fennoscandia is located in Laukaa. The paintings consists of over 100 figures. The oldest paintings are about 6 600 years old. The most common themes in Saraakallio paintings are deer, human, and boat figures. Saraakallio rock paintings are made by using red paint, which is made of hematite-containing soil mixed presumably with blood, urea and eggs.

== Keitele Canal ==
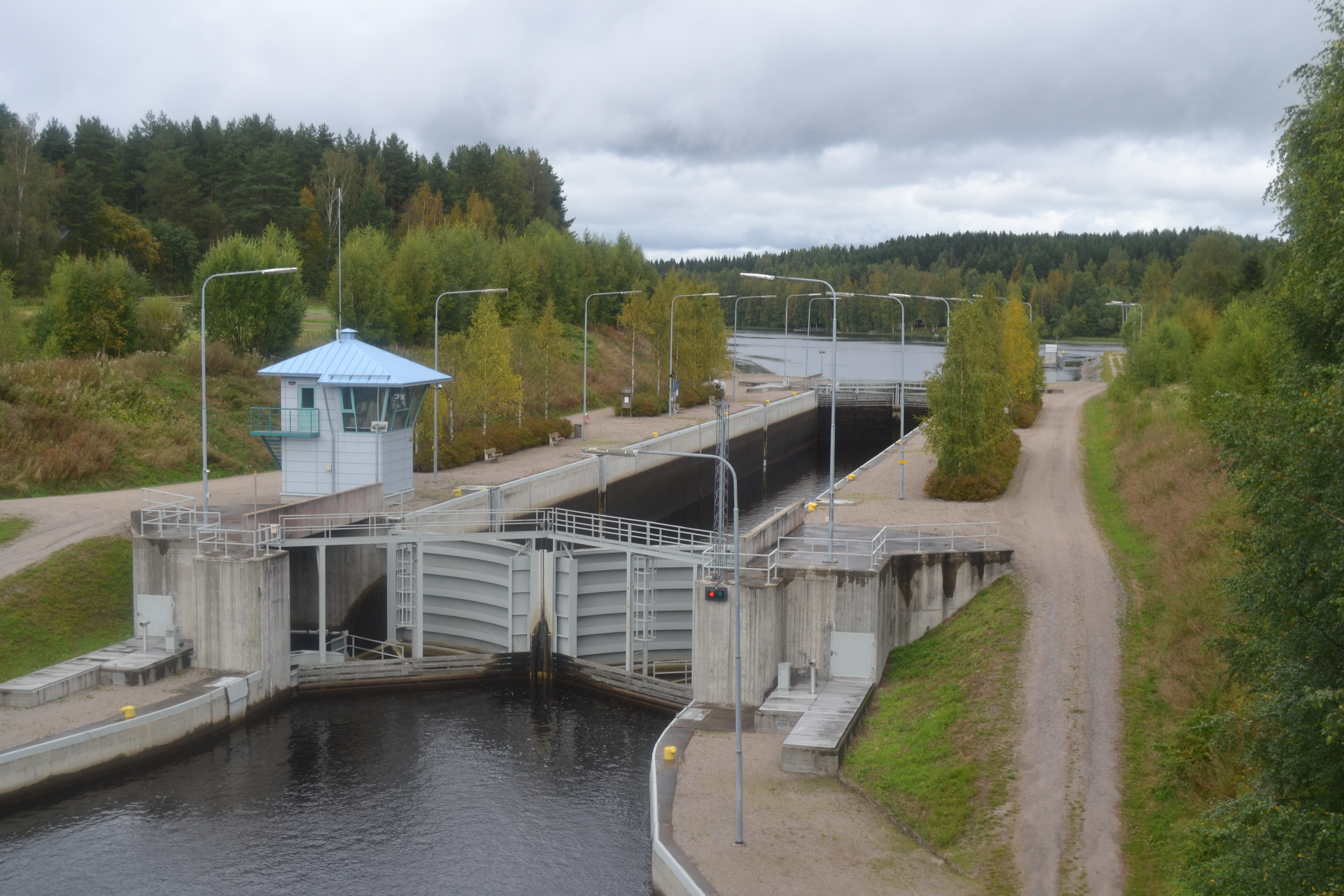
Kuhankoski Canal

Three of the five locks on the Keitele Canal (Kuusa, Kuhankoski and Kapeenkoski) are located in Laukaa. The canal route combines Lake Päijänne and Lake Keitele. The canal route was finished in 1994. Its original purpose was serving log floating. Nowadays the route is used by inland ships and boaters.

The construction of the canal was executed by the Russian Zarubezhtransstroi Company on a "turn key" basis in 1990-1994. The total length of the Keitele-Paijanne route is 48 kilometres (30 mi), of which 2.5 kilometres (1.6 mi) is canal section. Rest of the route follows river's natural water flow.

Kuusankoski, Kuhankoski, and Kapeenkoski are also famous recreational fishing places. The local theatre, Kuusan Kanavateatteri, Kuusa Canal Theatre, is active all year round giving performances in the restored building dating from the year 1914. In summer the Kuusa Canal forms a unique backdrop setting for the outdoor stage. The seating area is designed for 650 people and is covered with a canopy.

== Museums in Laukaa ==
- Laukaa Museum Village, Kalluntalo, is an open-air museum located in the centre of Laukaa, on the southern hillside of the Laukaa church. The premises of the open-air museum include a croft, a main residential building from the 18th century, and six other wooden folk buildings from the Laukaa area.
- Hartikka Stone Age Residential Area is located in Tarvaala, 10 km from the centre of Laukaa. The items found in the area, mainly in graves, are estimated to be from the time period of 6000 to 4000 B.C. and indicate that this had been a hunting community. One of the oldest church sites and graveyards in Central Finland, Hartikan kirkkomaa, is located right next to the Stone Age residential area of Hartikka.
- Croft of Hartikka, Hartikan Torppa, a home museum at Laukkavirta Village.
- Dugout Museum, Korsumuseo, in Peurunka.
- Kankaanpää Home Museum at Laukaan Asemankylä. The museum buildings and items on display are mainly from the 19th century farm house residence.

== People born in Laukaa ==
- Oskar Kaipio (1874 – 1918)
- Hannes Valkama (1876 – 1952)
- Jalmari Kovanen (1877 – 1936)
- August Koskinen (1878 – 1949)
- Juho Peura (1879 – 1918)
- Aapo Harjula (1880 – 1961)
- Otto Wille Kuusinen (1881 – 1964)
- Hilda Hannunen (1882 – ?)
- Atte Muhonen (1888 – 1954)
- Lauri Kaijalainen (1900 – 1965)
- Asser Salo (1902 – 1938)
- Paavo Vesterinen (1918 – 1993)
- Sirkka Lekman (1944 –)
- Juha Kankkunen (1959 –)
- Ville Tuppurainen (1988 –)

== Twin towns and sister cities ==
Laukaa is twinned with:

- Modum, Norway
- Stevns, Denmark
- Östra Göinge, Sweden

== Gallery ==
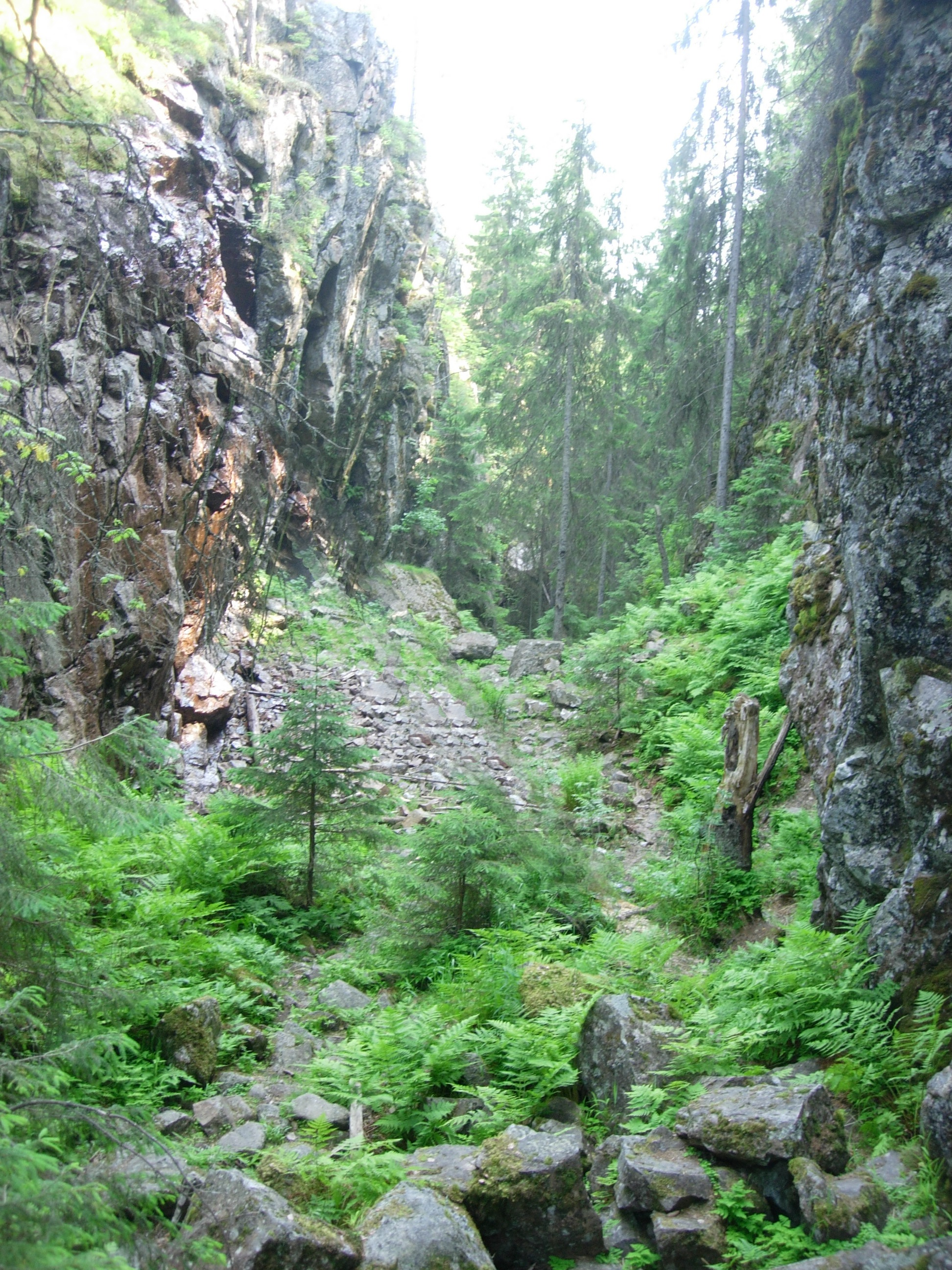
Hitonhauta Nature Reserve

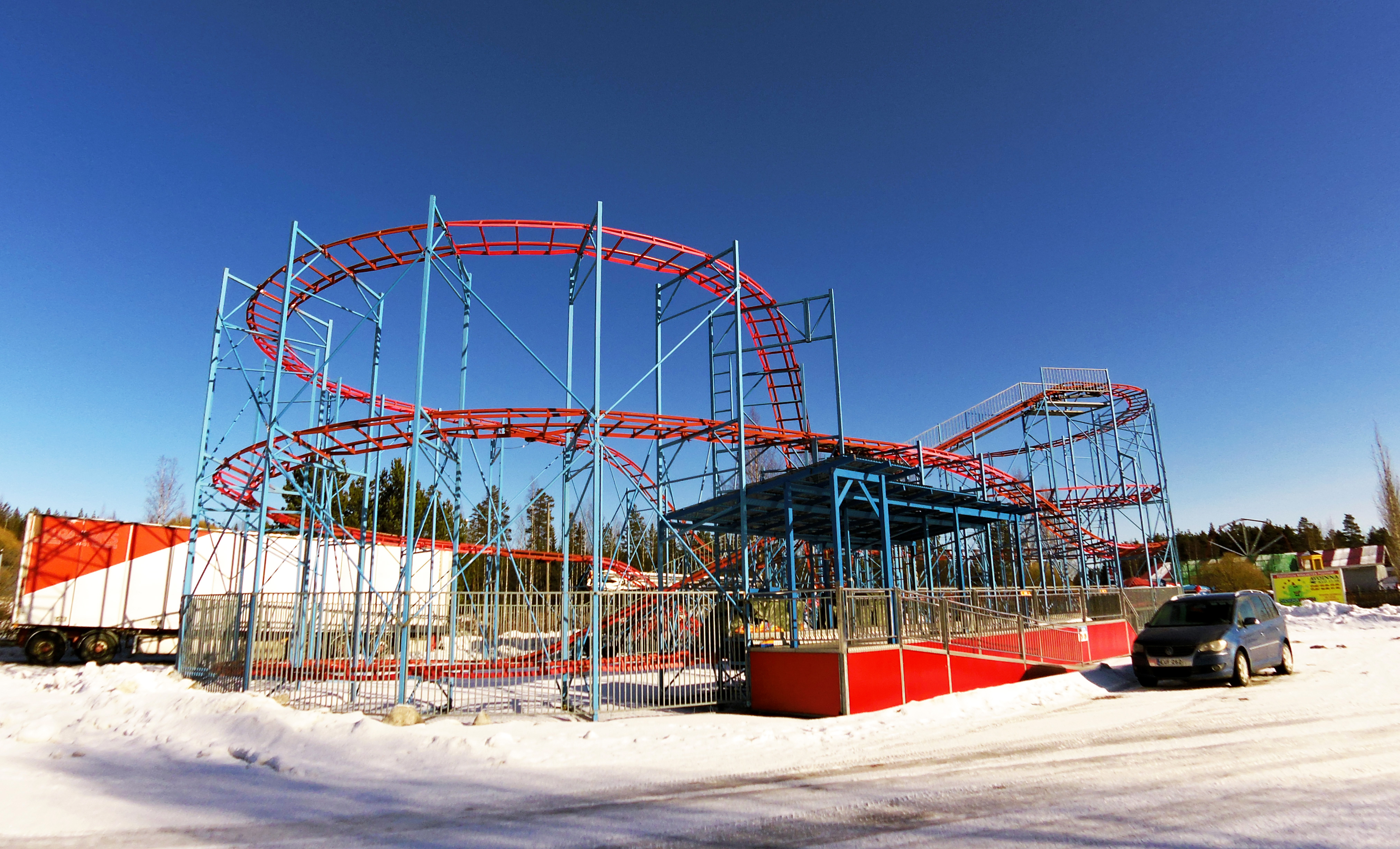
Cyclon rollercoaster in the Nokkakivi amusement park

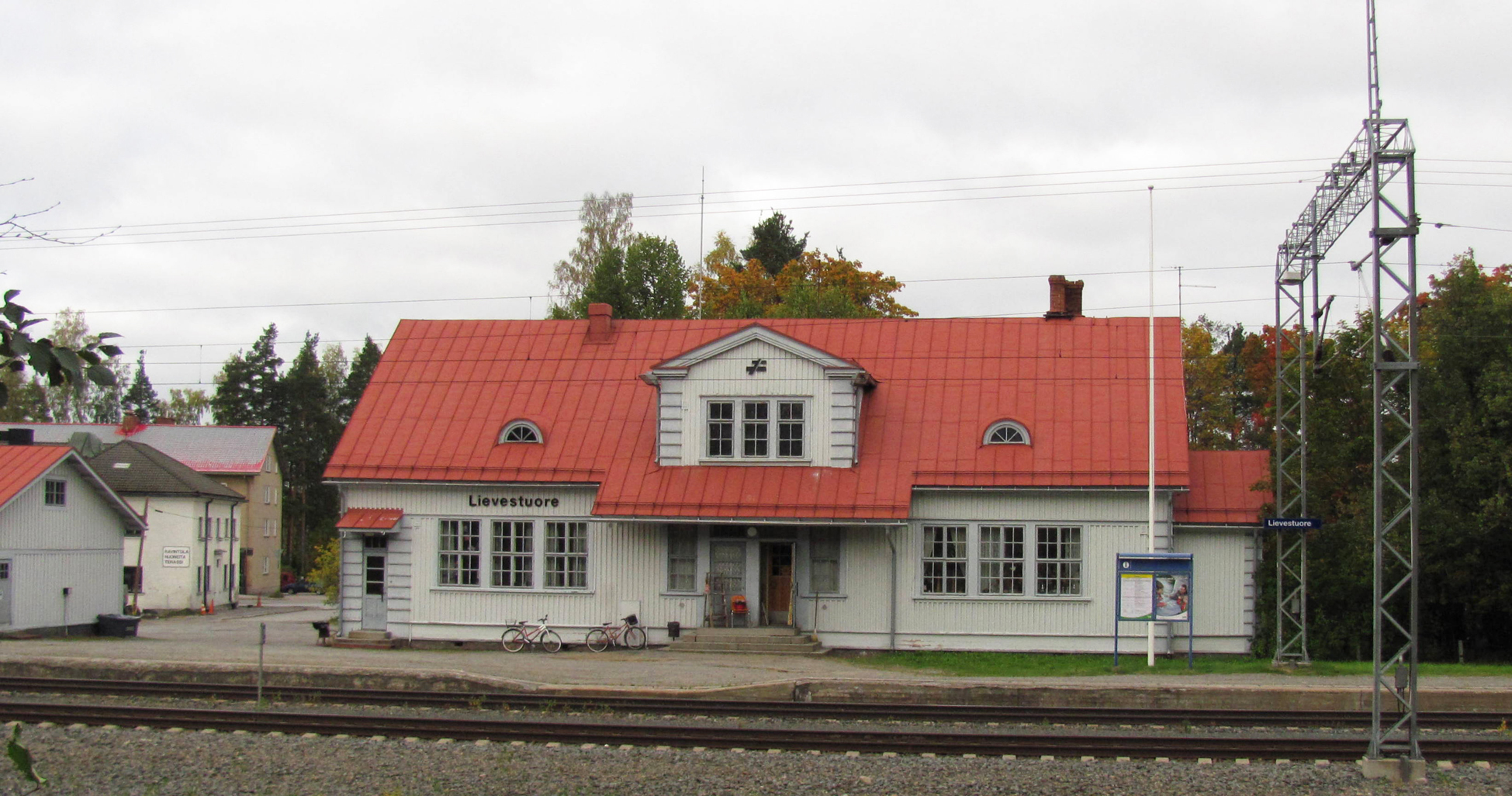
Lievestuore railway station

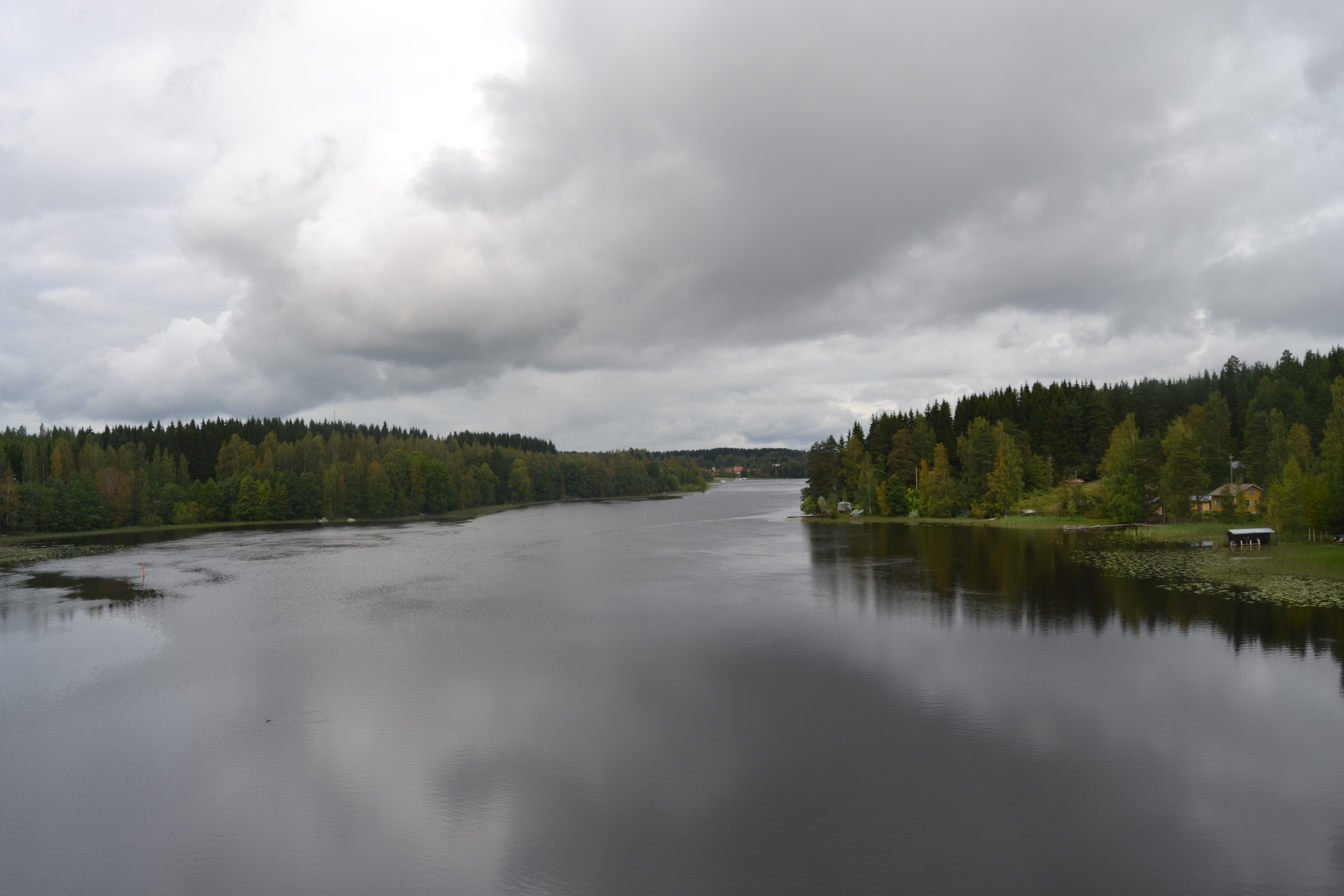
Lake Saraavesi

== See also ==
- Finnish national road 69
