= Villa (footballer) =

Brazilian footballer

Personal information
- Full name: Rodrigo Augusto Sartori Costa
- Date of birth: 11 January 1983 (age 43)
- Place of birth: São Paulo, Brazil
- Height: 1.73 m (5 ft 8 in)
- Position: Midfielder

Youth career
- 1995–2003: Corinthians Paulista

Senior career*
Years	Team	Apps	(Gls)
2004	Serra Negra		
2004	Pasto		
2004	Guaraní Antonio Franco		
2005	Santa Rita		
2005	Portuguesa (SP)		
2006–2007	C.A. Rentistas		
2007	Chiasso	5	(0)
2008–2009	PFC Belasitsa Petrich	30	(1)
- * Club domestic league appearances and goals as of December 1, 2008

Rodrigo Augusto Sartori Costa (born 11 January 1983), better known as Villa, is a Brazilian footballer.

== Football career ==
Surnamed Sartori-Costa, he holds an Italian nationality by descent.

He started his career at Corinthians Paulista. In 2004, he left for Serra Negra. On 2 July 2004, he left Brazil for Pasto of Colombia. He then played for Guaraní Antonio Franco and C.D. Santa Rita of Ecuador until 29 July 2005, back to Brazil for Portuguesa (SP).

On 8 February 2006, Villa left Brazil again, this time to C.A. Rentistas, and on 31 August 2007 arrived in Europe to play for Chiasso.
