= Sartori =

Origin
- Meaning: Occupational name from sarto, "tailor"
- Region of origin: pan-Italic

Sartori is an Italian surname. Notable people with the surname include:

- Agostinho José Sartori (1929–2012), Roman Catholic bishop
- Alcindo Sartori (born 1967), retired Brazilian football player
- Alessandro Sartori artistic director of Ermenegildo Zegna group
- Alessio Sartori (born 1976), Italian competition rower and Olympic champion
- Amalia Sartori (born 1947), Italian politician
- Amleto Sartori (1915 - 1962), Italian sculptor and mask-maker.
- Athanase Sartori (born 1852, date of death unknown), French sports shooter
- Carlo Sartori (born 1948), British and Italian professional footballer
- Claudio Sartori (1913–1994), Italian musicologist
- Diego Sartori (born 1959), Argentine politician
- Francesco Sartori (born 1957), Italian composer and musician
- Gianni Sartori (born 1946), retired Italian track cyclist
- Giovanni Sartori (1924–2017), Italian political scientist
- Giovanni Sartori (footballer) (born 1957), Italian professional football official and a former player
- Homero Sartori (born 1983), Argentine-Brazilian former footballer
- Ian Sartori (born 1958), former Australian rules footballer
- Igor Sartori (born 1993), Brazilian born Striker
- José Ivo Sartori (born 1948), Brazilian politician
- José Lorenzo Sartori (1932–2018), Argentine priest
- Joseph Francis Sartori (1858–1946), American banker and civic leader
- Juan Sartori (born 1981), Uruguayan businessman and entrepreneur
- Nicola Sartori (born 1976), Italian rower
- Nicolás Sartori (born 1976), Argentine footballer
- Penny Sartori (PhD), British medical researcher
- Peter Sartori (born 1957), British & Italian businessman
- Peter Sartori (born 1964), Australian rules football player
- Ray Sartori (1885–1961), Australian rules footballer
- Rodrigo Augusto Sartori Costa (born 1983), Brazilian football player
- Salvador Sartori (1827-1899), italian-Brazilian politician and merchant

== See also ==
- Sartori family
