= Saraakallio =

Cliff in Laukaa, Finland

Coordinates: 62.417°N 26.000°E

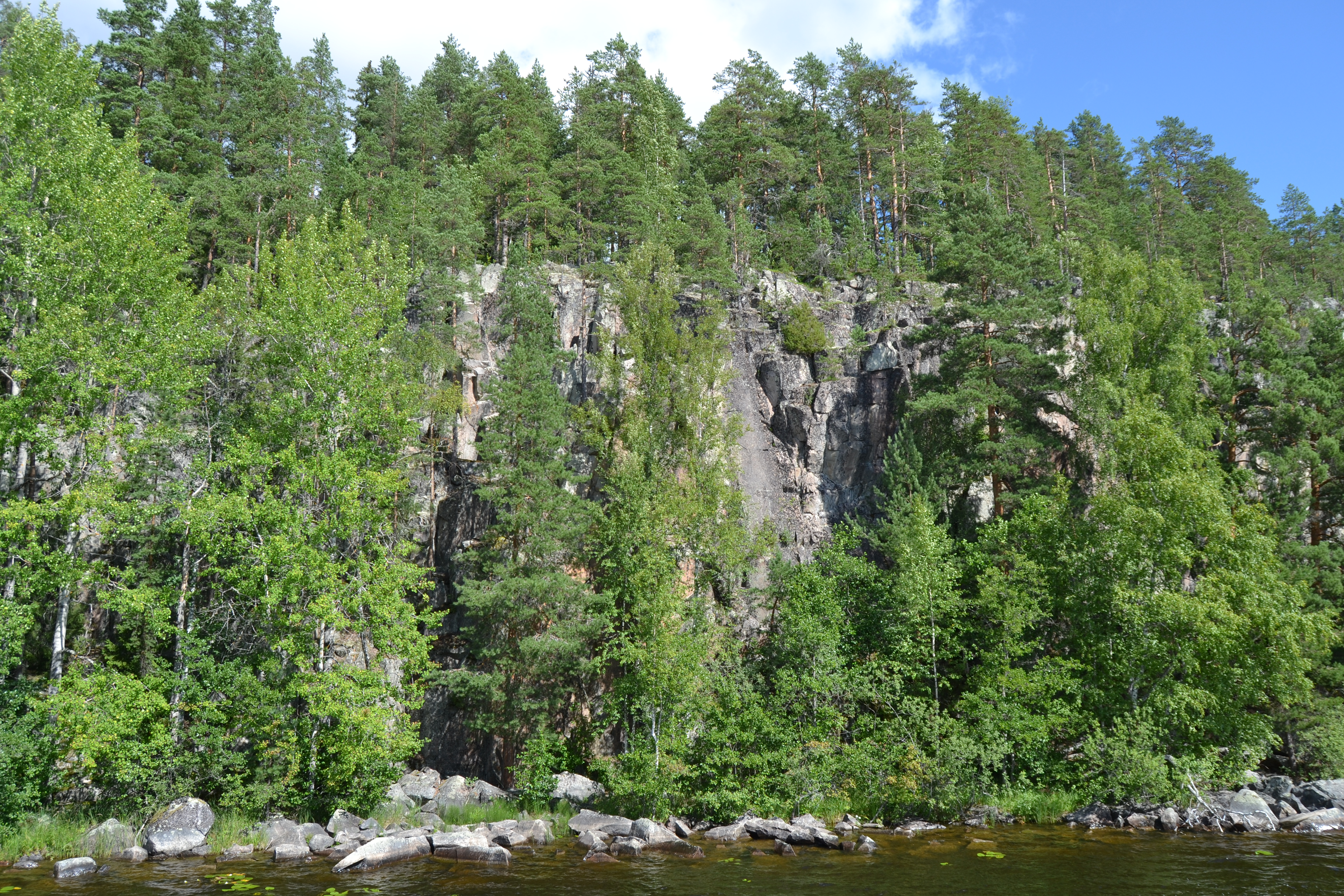
Saraakallio seen from Saraavesi

Saraakallio (also referred to in the plural: Saraakalliot) is a cliff in Laukaa, Finland. It is located on the eastern shore of lake Saraavesi, opposite the municipal center Laukaan kirkonkylä, rising 10–25 meters (33–82 ft) above the lake's surface. In addition to being the site of the Saraakallio rock paintings, it is a nationally valuable outcrop and is also part of the Natura 2000 network.

== Geography ==
Saraakallio is located on the eastern shore of Saraavesi on an isthmus between it and Kuusvesi, and near the settlement of Ränssintaipale between Kuusa to the north and Tarvaala to the south. The administrative center of Laukaa, Laukaan kirkonkylä, lies on the opposite shore of Saraavesi. The distance between the shores is about 2 kilometers (1.2 mi).

Saraakallio is classified as a nationally valuable outcrop. The highest point of the hill the cliff is part of is located 125 meters (410 ft) above sea level and 40 meters (130 ft) above Saraavesi, while the cliff itself is about 10–25 meters (33–82 ft) high. It is composed of porphyritic granodiorite and was formed by erosion as the water level continued to drop following deglaciation. After the Fennoscandian ice sheet had retreated from the area, most of it, including Saraakallio, was submerged. The shoreline of the Yoldia Sea is visible on the nearby Ahvenpyhä hill, the summit of a drumlin 1.5 kilometers (0.93 mi) southeast of Saraakallio, at an elevation of 157 meters (515 ft) (the peak of Ahvenpyhä is at 165 m [541 ft]). When the Yoldia Sea had become the Ancylus Lake, the shoreline was, at its highest, 130–135 meters (427–443 ft) above modern sea level. The modern lakes of Laukaa began to form around 9,500 years BP.

The area of Saraakallio is mostly covered by dry, spruce- and pine-dominated forest, but a section of more fertile mixed forest is also found in the southwestern part. The cliff itself is largely covered by lichens such as Lasallia pustulata, as well as by oligotrophic mosses. Mesotrophic mosses such as Homalothecium sericeum, Amphidium lapponicum and Homalia trichomanoides, as well as the endangered lichen Lobaria scrobiculata, are found around the highest point. Other noteworthy plants include Poa glauca and Asplenium trichomanes. Saraakallio is part of the Natura 2000 site of the "Vatianjärvi–Saraavesi area" (Vatianjärven–Saraaveden alue), including various other features around the lakes Saraavesi and Vatianjärvi, such as the Kuusaankoski rapids and the Hiidenvuori hill, which also features outcrops.

During winter, the municipality of Laukaa maintains a skiing route over the lake, connecting Saraakallio to the harbor of central Laukaa. A floating pier for observation accessible by boat was installed near the cliff in 2025. An information center was also opened at the harbor.

== History ==
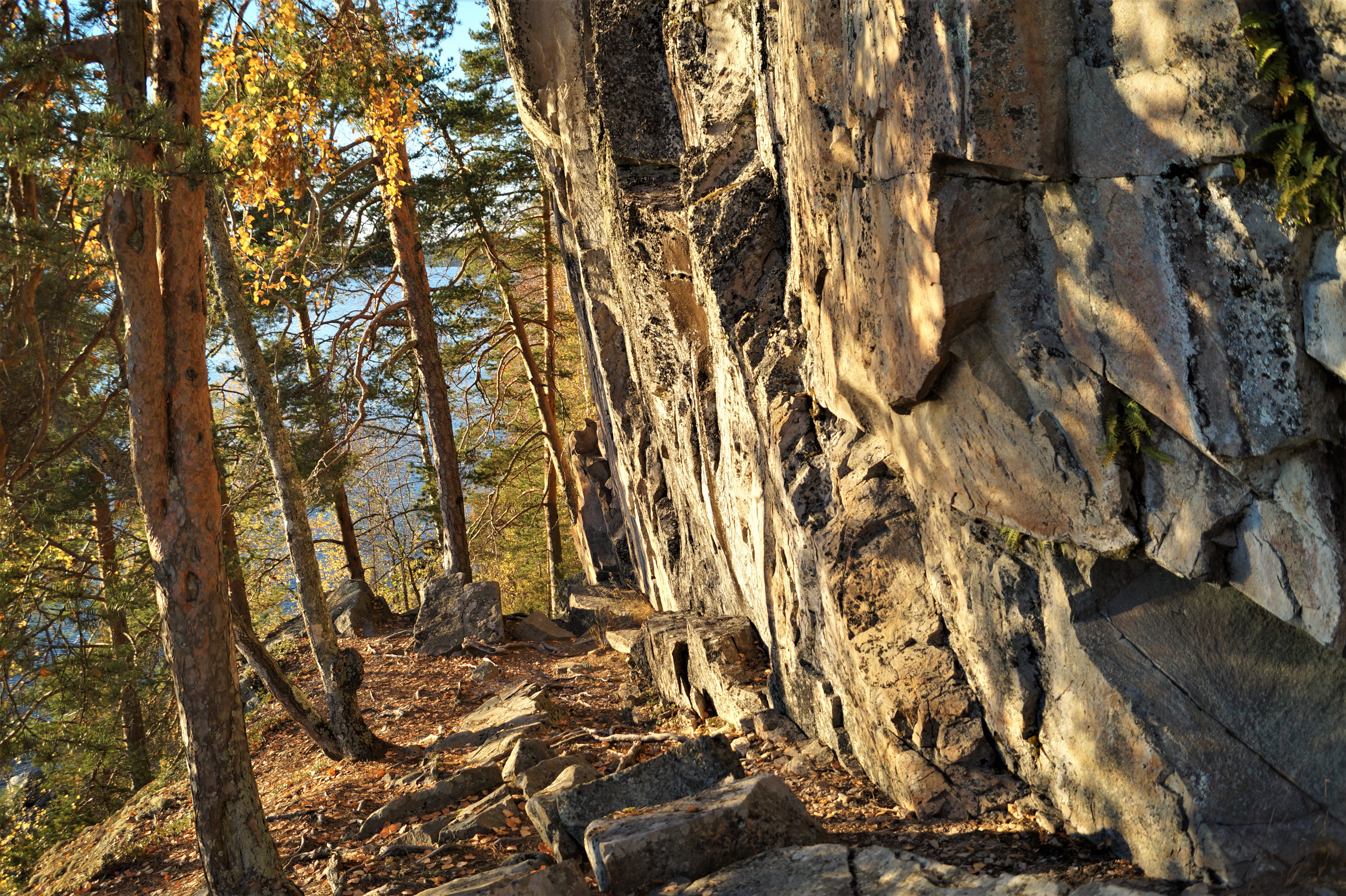
View by the cliff

The earliest figures of the Saraakallio rock paintings have been dated to the early Comb Ceramic period, about 5,000 years ago. As of 2012, two sites of rock paintings on the cliff are known: the larger Saraakallio I at the lakeshore, and the smaller Saraakallio II some 230 meters (750 ft) southeast of the aforementioned and 40 meters (130 ft) further inland. The former was first described in 1975, and the latter in 1983.

Saraakallio was first mentioned by name in 1776 as Sara Vuori. The cliff is named after the lake Saraavesi, though the element Saraa- may be a reference to the paintings on the prominent cliff, possibly via the dialectal word saraja 'boat shed', as the paintings depict boats. It may also be connected to sarajas, a sea or river in Finnish mythology, since the paintings would likely have had mythological significance to the later Finnish population of the area. The cliff is located near the point where the historically important water routes to Saarijärvi, Viitasaari and Rautalampi meet.
