= Laukaan kirkonkylä =

Laukaan kirkonkylä Pellosniemi
- Municipal center
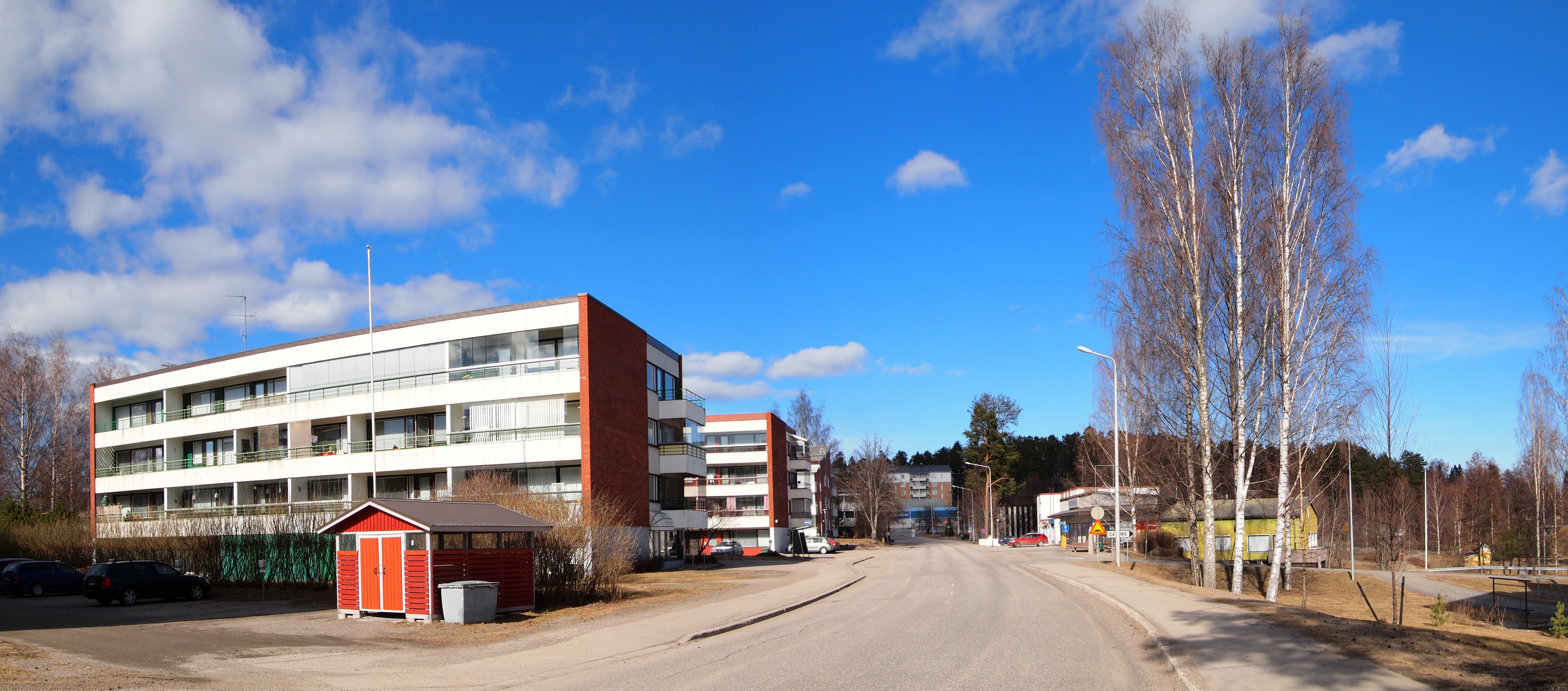
- View from the road Laukaantie.

- Location in Central Finland Laukaan kirkonkylä (Finland)
- Coordinates: 62.414°N 25.955°E
- Country: Finland
- Region: Central Finland
- Sub-region: Jyväskylä sub-region
- Municipality: Laukaa

Population (2023-12-31)
  - Total: 8,332
  - Density: 400/km^{2} (1,000/sq mi)
- Time zone: UTC+2 (EET)
  - Summer (DST): UTC+3 (EEST)
- Postal code: 41340

Laukaan kirkonkylä (lit. 'Laukaa church village'), historically known as Pellosniemi, is an urban area (a taajama) and the administrative center of the municipality of Laukaa, Finland. It is located between two lakes, Saraavesi in the east and the smaller Vuojärvi in the west.

Formerly a rural village formed on lands of the Pellosniemi vicarage, the modern urban area largely developed during the late 20th century. The regional road 637 (Jyväskyläntie) passes through the settlement.

The urban area, as defined by Statistics Finland, had a population of 8,332 on 31 December 2023. This definition includes Vihtavuori, which was still counted as a separate urban area in 2020.

== Names ==
The official name of the urban area has been Laukaan kirkonkylä since the late 1960s. The settlement's older name is Pellosniemi, which is also the name of the vicarage and the cape it is located on. The name Pellosniemi was first mentioned in 1586. It contains the word pelto meaning "field", and thus may refer to an area where settled agriculture was practiced early on, as opposed to slash-and-burn agriculture, which was more common in the region at that time. The name may also be connected to a 16th-century administrative unit (hallintopitäjä) also called Pellosniemi near modern Mikkeli, as one of the earliest settlers of this village came from the Mikkeli area.

== Geography and nature ==
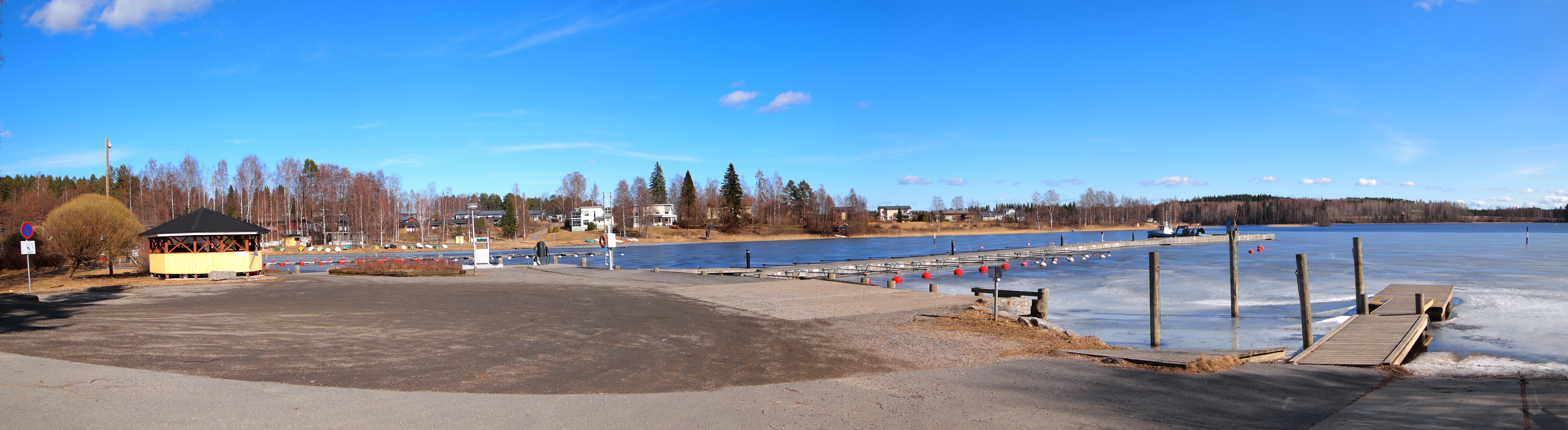
The harbor of Laukaa on the Saraavesi.

Situated in the center of the municipality, Laukaan kirkonkylä is located between two lakes, Saraavesi and Vuojärvi. There are also two smaller bodies of water further south, Lahnajärvi and Petäälampi.

Laukaan kirkonkylä is located by a terminal moraine (Sisä-Suomen reunamuodostuma), which is visible as a ridge beginning from the southwest around the hills Aikalanmäki and Kataanmäki, extending to the northeast towards the Kylmäniemi cape. There are also small wetlands, such as Akkasuo, which consists of open bog and forested swamp.

The Saraakallio cliff, featuring rock paintings, is also nearby, on the eastern shore of Saraavesi. During winter, a skiing route connects the cliff to the harbor in Laukaan kirkonkylä.

== History ==
=== Prehistory ===
Various prehistoric findings have been made in the village, ranging from the Stone Age to the Iron Age. An example is the Hevosenpää site, a well-preserved early Metal Age settlement in the northern part of the village, on a former island of the Saraavesi now surrounded by wetland.

Tavastians had hunted in the area since at least the 14th century, using waterways to access lands as far as modern Savonia.

=== Early modern ===
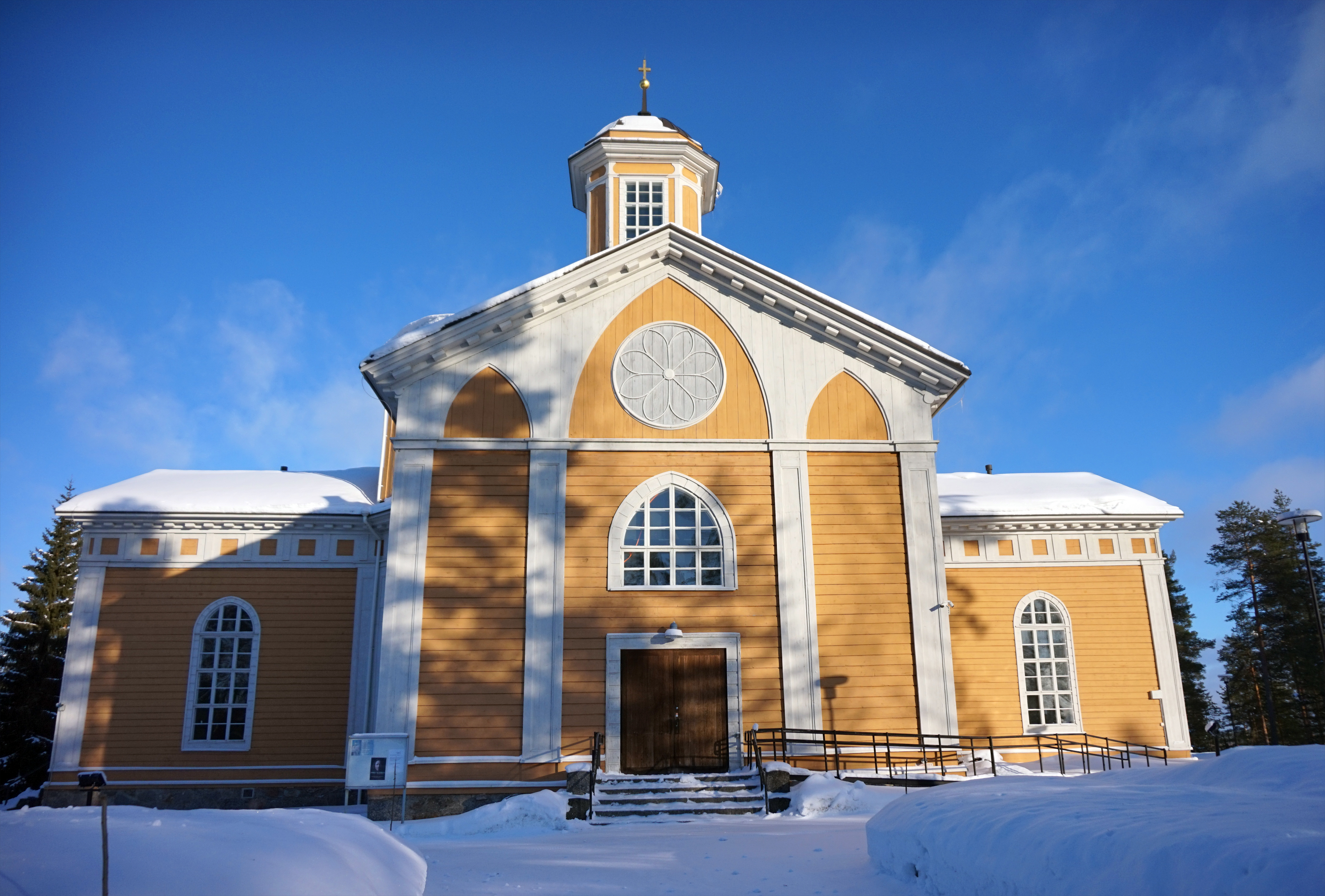
The church of Laukaa.

In the 15th century, the lands around Saraavesi were hunting grounds privately held by land-owning farmers from the villages of Kurhila and Viitaila in Asikkala, Matkantaka in Hauho as well as Hauhiala and Kaitala in Lammi. During the 1450s, most of these were bought by Olof Nilsson Tavast (Olavi Niilonpoika), a nobleman who held the Porkkala manor in Lammi and acted as a judge in the Hollola hundred (kihlakunta). The borders of these hunting grounds, by then held by the Lahinen manor in Sääksmäki, were stated in a verdict from 1504. The Pellosniemi cape had not been acquired by the nobility and was mentioned as belonging to Heikki Mölö (Mölönen) from Matkantaka.

The settling of the hunting grounds in modern Central Finland began around the 1540s during the reign of King Gustav Vasa, who declared uninhabited lands property of the crown in 1542, encouraging settlers to move away from older, crowded settlements. The hunting grounds of the Mölönen family were settled by another Heikki Mölönen in 1579. Initially known as Saravesi, the new settlement was first called Pellosniemi in 1583. However, the Mölönen family returned to Hauho soon after this year. The abandoned farm was resettled by Lauri Ikonen, probably from Visulahti (near Mikkeli), in 1590. Pellosniemi (officially a village, despite being a single farm) was held by the Ikonen family until 1608, when it was acquired by pastor Thomas Andreae.

Modern Laukaa was initially part of the Rautalampi parish, likely having been separated from it in 1593. The new parish was named Laukaa, as its first church was located by the Laukaankoski rapids, modern Tarvaalankoski in the village of Tarvaala. The vicarage was also originally located around modern Tarvaala, on the shore of lake Lievestuoreenjärvi at the site of the modern Alatalo farm. The old vicarage was hard to access during winter, due to which pastor Andreae eventually moved to Pellosniemi, located along a winter route connecting Hämeenlinna, Jyväskylä, Rautalampi and Kuopio. Governor-general Per Brahe accepted the relocation of the vicarage to Pellosniemi in 1639. As the church had become decrepit by the latter half of the 17th century, a new church was to be built in Pellosniemi near the vicarage. The first church was abandoned after the completion of the new church in 1685.

The vicarage was the only independent estate in Pellosniemi for long, though various tenant farms (torppa) under it began to be established in the 18th century. The first one was Vuojärvi, which was first mentioned in 1707. Other early tenant farms included Mikkola (first mentioned c. 1726–1731), Jokiniemi and Klemettilä (1753), of which the latter was divided into Ala-Klemettilä and Ylä-Klemettilä in 1763. Many tenants were also church workers, such as sacristans or gravediggers. While tenants of vicarages were allowed to clear new fields for themselves, the pastor could order tenants to move their farms if their fields prevented the vicarage from expanding its own. This happened in the late 19th century, when Mikkola was relocated to the Kuusaankoski rapids and renamed to Koskela.

=== Modern ===
Despite being the administrative center of Laukaa, Pellosniemi remained small when compared to other villages such as Lievestuore and Äänekoski (the latter being part of Laukaa until 1911) due to a lack of industrialization. In the 1890s, the Jyväskylä–Suolahti railway was built through Laukaa, but as it did not pass through the settlement around the church, a new settlement began to develop around the Laukaa station.

Most tenant farms under the vicarage became independent in the 1920s. Some of its lands were also used to resettle Karelian refugees after World War II. In 1944, around 250 evacuees were settled in Pellosniemi, mostly from the Sortavala area. Both the settlement of evacuees and the transition to a post-industrial society caused Pellosniemi to start developing into an urban area; there were 2,500 inhabitants in the mid-1960s, which had increased to almost 4,500 by the late 1980s. The modern name of the settlement, Laukaan kirkonkylä, was officially adopted in the late 1960s.

The urban area kept growing between the 1990s and 2000s, when its population increased by more than a thousand people. Buildings on the eastern side of the regional road 637 are generally older, while those on the western side are newer. The national housing fair (Suomen Asuntomessut) of 2003 was held on the Pellosniemi cape. The most recent expansion to the zoning plan was made in 2022, allowing the urban area to expand towards Vihtavuori.

== Population ==
On 31 December 2023, the urban area had a population of 8,332, a surface area of 20.83 square kilometres (8.04 sq mi) and a population density of 400 inhabitants per square kilometre (1,000/sq mi). According to this definition, the urban area includes Vihtavuori as well as parts of the villages of Kuhankoski, Kuhanniemi and Vihtasilta. Vihtavuori was still counted as its own urban area by Statistics Finland in 2020.

The municipality of Laukaa also has its own statistical areas with defined borders. At the end of 2020, 5,791 people lived in the Kirkonkylä statistical area, which is subdivided into five parts: central (1,562), northern (2,018), southern (1,883), Roninmäki (54) and the station area (274).

== Services ==
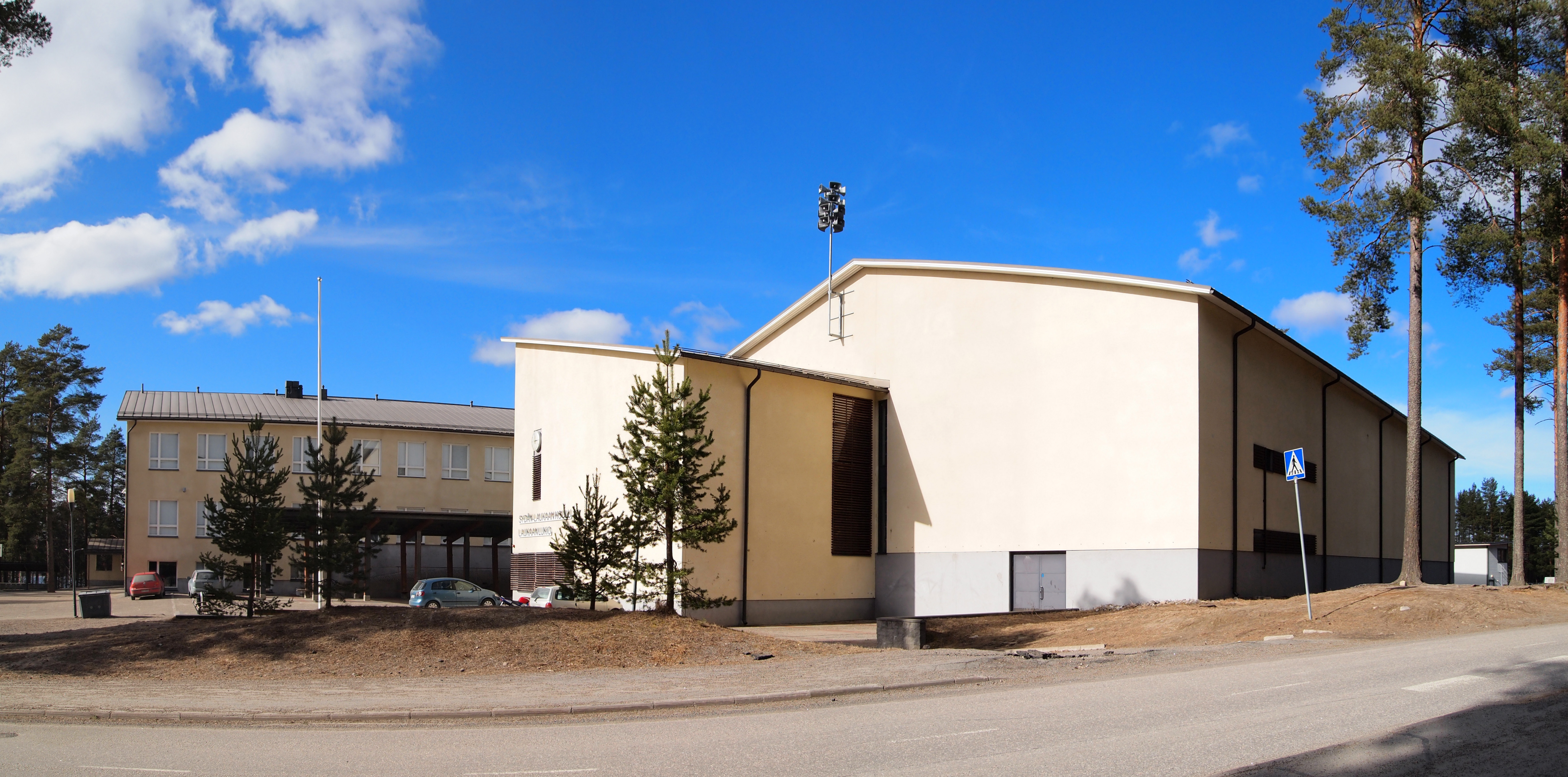
Sydän-Laukaan koulu in 2014.

Most municipal services of Laukaa are concentrated in the urban area, including a comprehensive school for grades 1–9 (peruskoulu) and a gymnasium (lukio), a fire station, municipal clinic, pharmacy, three grocery stores and a bank.

=== Education ===
There are two comprehensive schools in the urban area, Laukaan kirkonkylän koulu for grades 0–6 (alakoulu) and Sydän-Laukaan koulu for grades 7–9 (yläkoulu). The latter shares a building with the gymnasium and a vocational school.

The first school (under the kansakoulu system) in the village was established in 1870, being the fifth school to be established in Central Finland. The school acquired its own building in November 1872.
