= Finnish rock art =

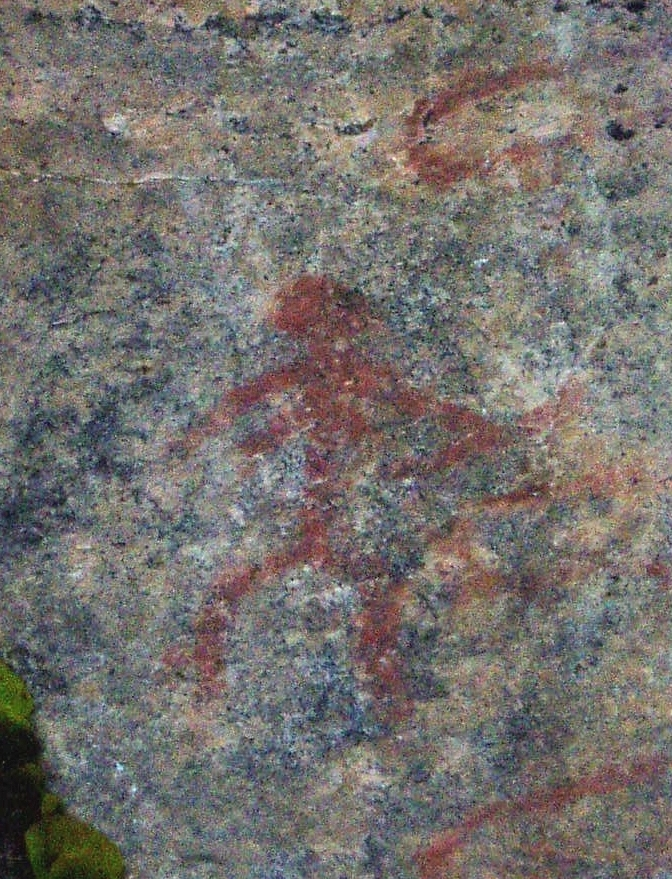
A woman figure with a bow - the Tellervo of Astuva - a rarity among the rock paintings.

Finnish rock art pictographs created during the Stone Age have been found at 127 sites around Finland. They consist mainly of brownish-red figures and markings painted onto steep granite walls, often overlooking waterways. There are scenes featuring people, boats, elk, fish and mysterious part human figures. The survival of the art in adverse climatic conditions is due to their protection by a naturally forming thin layer of silicon dioxide on the rock surface.

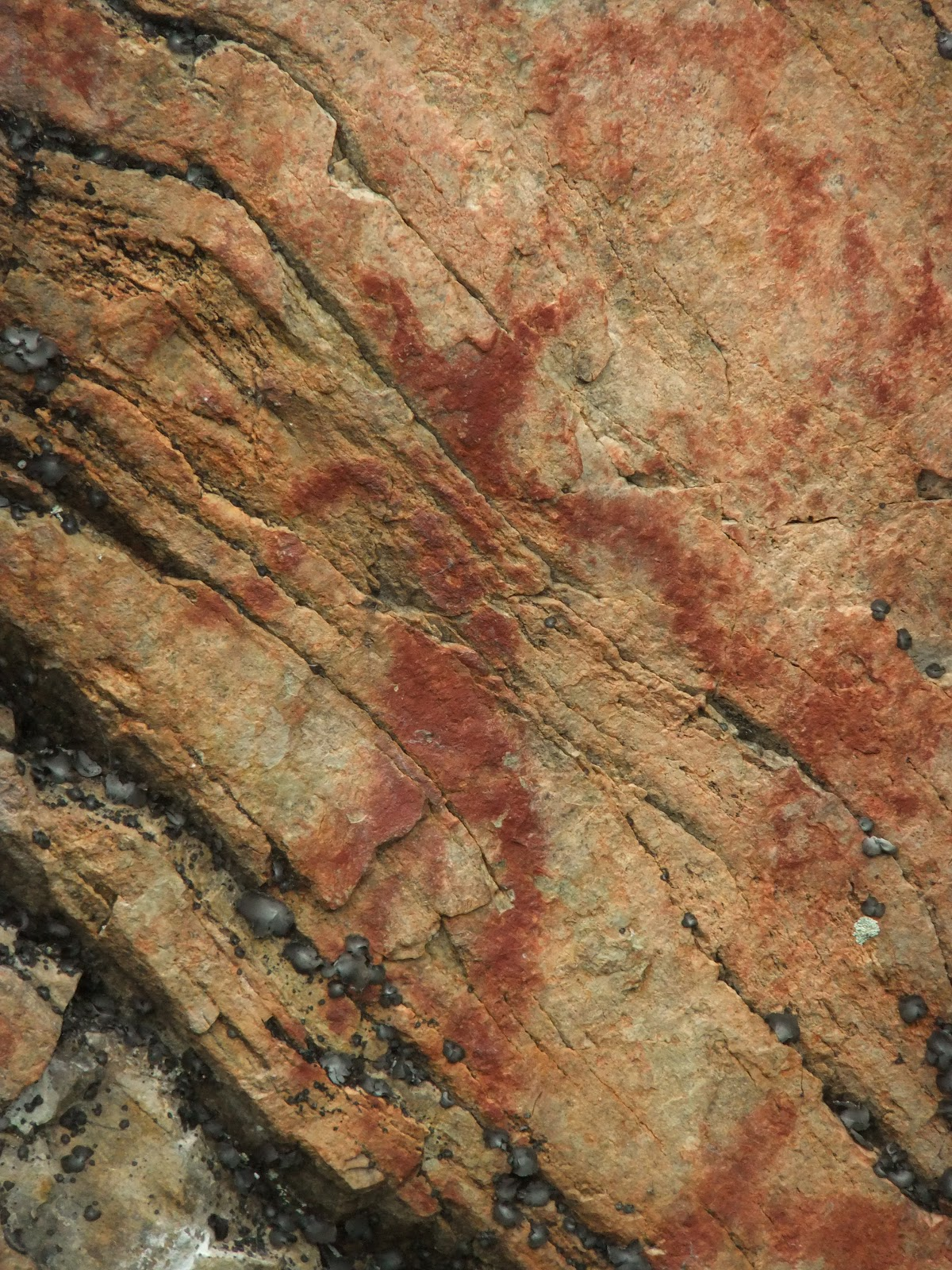
Värikallio, Finland.

The Comb Ceramic Culture who lived in what is now Finland between 5000 BC and 2000 BC is credited with their production. The paints used included a mix of iron oxide, blood, and animal fat or egg, although traces of the organic materials are no longer detectable. Characteristic to the art are sacrificial parts (arrow points, bones, signs of fire, etc.) and the location on steep cliffs at water’s edge. Similar sites can be found in parts of Northern Sweden, Norway and Russia – mainly, it seems, in areas once populated by the Saami or other Finno-Ugric peoples.

The first paintings to be recognised as Stone Age were reported in 1911 by Jean Sibelius, whose eye was caught by strange patterns on a lakeside cliff near Hvitträsk, the home of his friend, architect Eliel Saarinen.

More paintings were discovered in the 1960s a few miles west of Hvitträsk at Juusjärvi. At first they were thought to be recent graffiti daubed by power line workers, but they were soon ascertained to be several thousand years old.

Most of the paintings lie in the Saimaa and Päijänne lake districts. By far the best-known site, at Astuvansalmi, has been proposed as a UNESCO World Heritage Site. Another site is Värikallio in the Hossa Hiking Area. This has unusual figures with triangular heads. The biggest painted area is in Central Finland, where the Saraakallio rock paintings includes 50–200 pictures, maybe even more.

Värikalli is one of the two northernmost sites of rock art in Finland. It was discovered in 1977 by two skiers and over sixty figures have been identified.

== Gallery ==
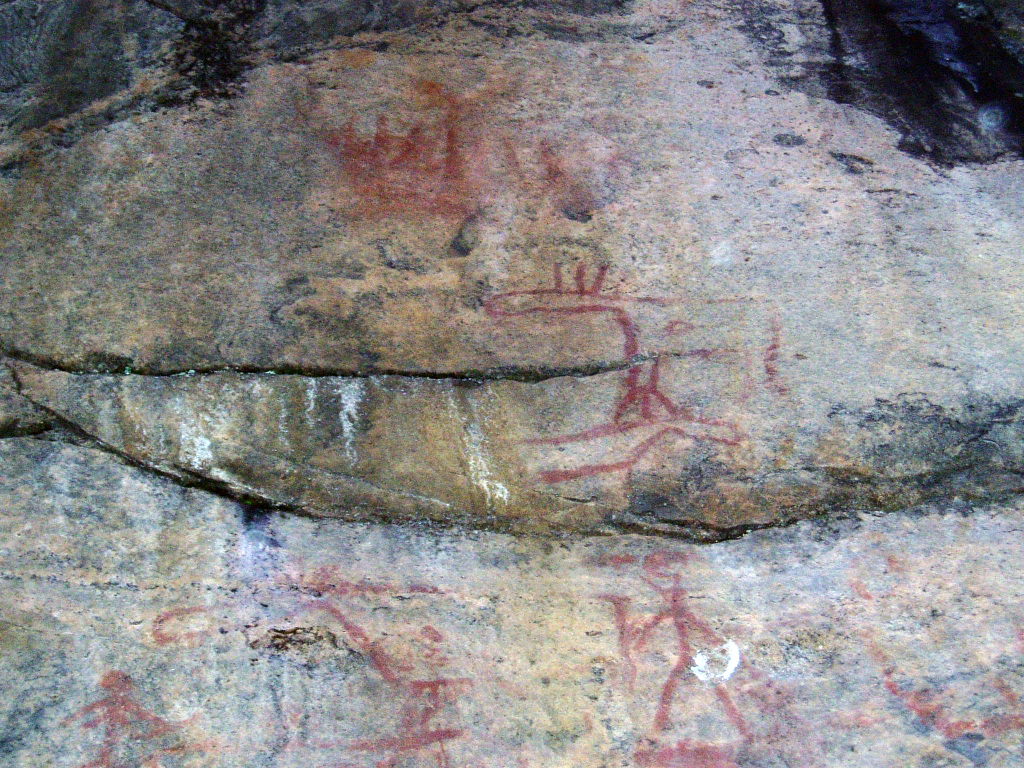
Astuvansalmi rock paintings (moose, human figures and a boat)

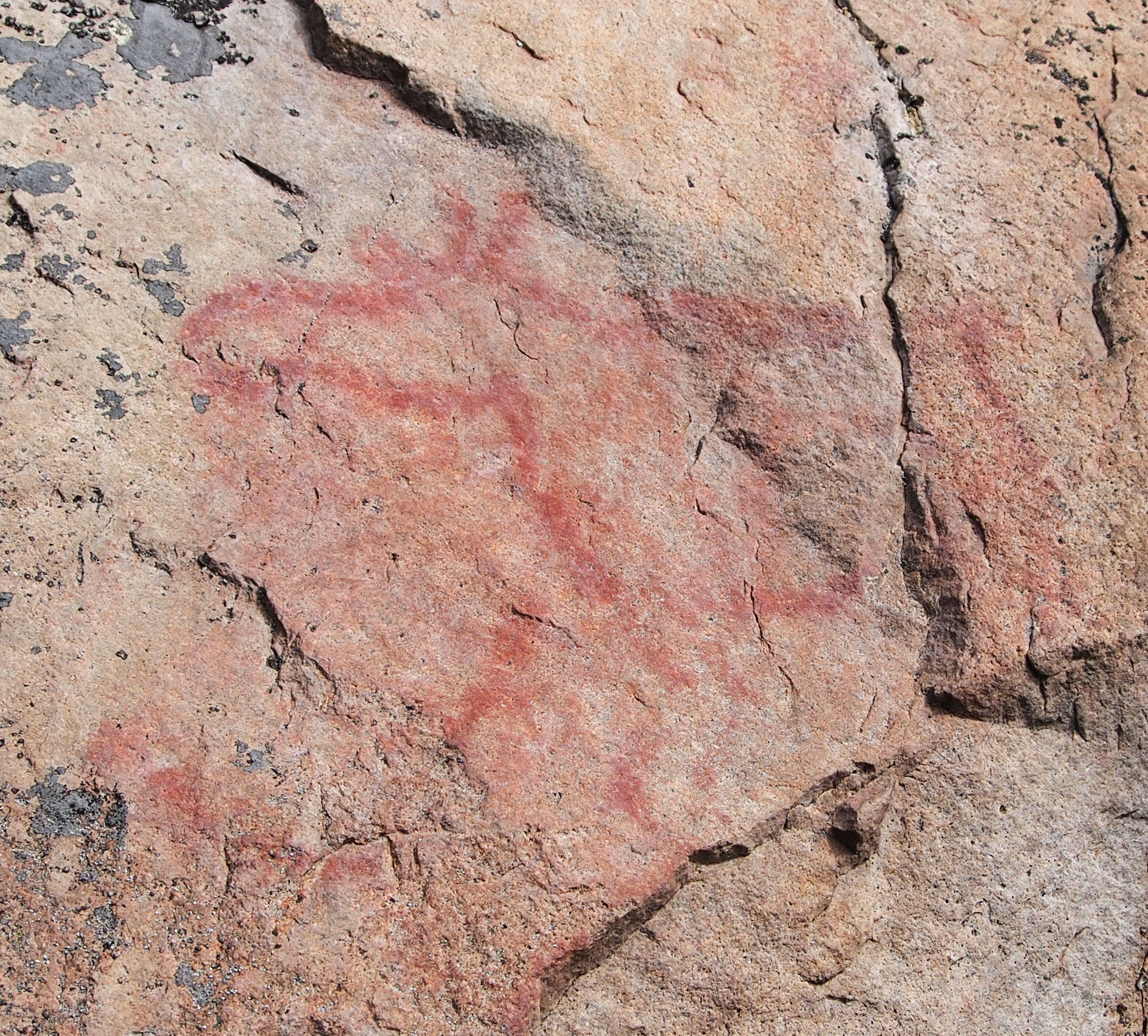
Saraakallio rock paintings (moose)

== See also ==
- Petroglyph
- Prehistoric art
- Art in Finland
