= Saraakallio rock paintings =

Prehistoric rock art in Finland

Coordinates: 62°25.03′N 25°59.80′E

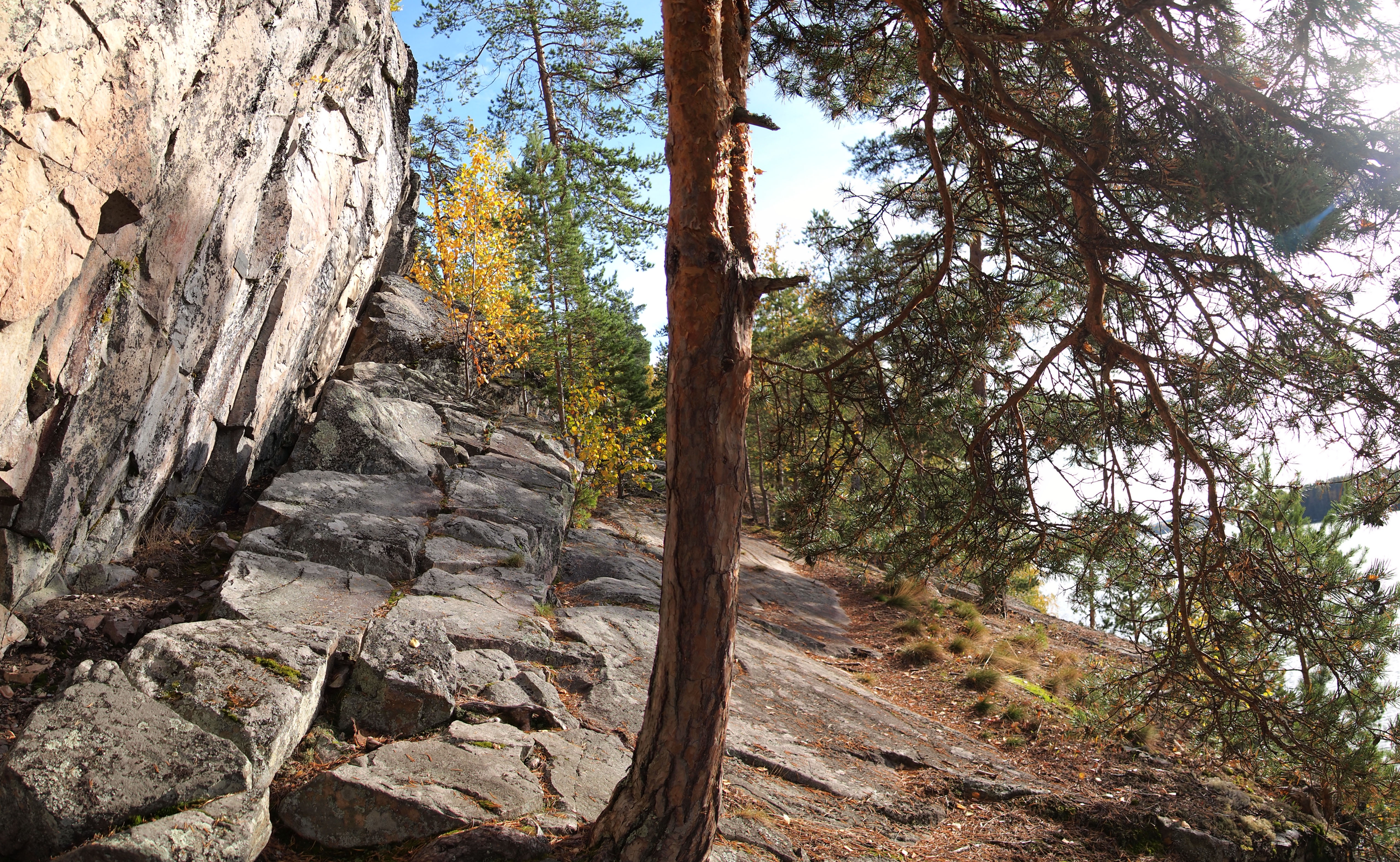
Saraakallio

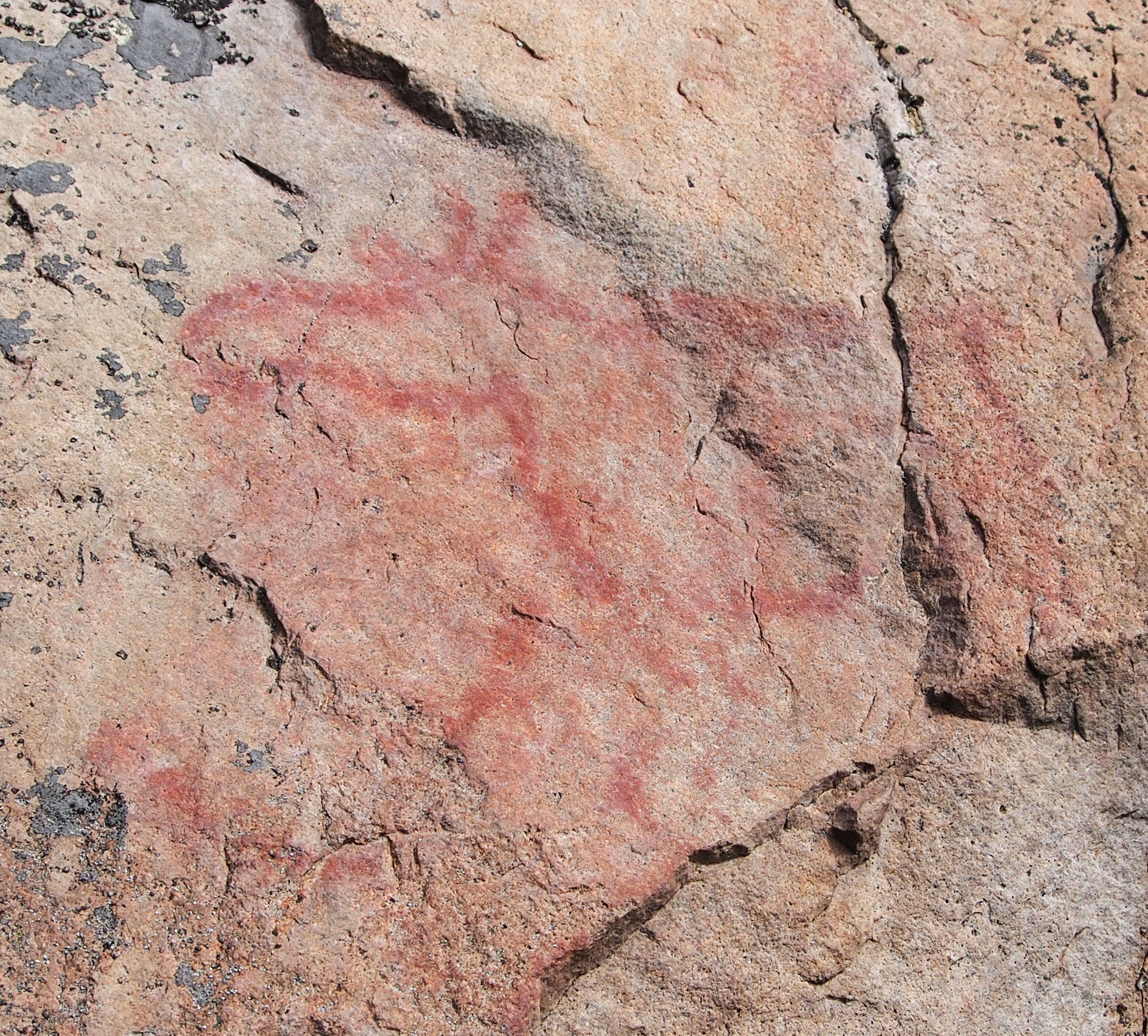
A moose

Saraakallio rock paintings (Finnish: Saraakallion kalliomaalaukset) are situated on the Saraakallio cliff in Laukaa, Central Finland. The rock site lies on the eastern shore of Lake Saraavesi, on the opposite shore from the municipal center. The rocky cliff of Saraakallio is an impressive landmark rising on the shore of the lake. An important water route, the Keitele Canal, runs in front of the paintings.

There are two art areas, Saraakallio I and Saraakallio II. It is difficult to count and list all the paintings of Saraakallio, partly because they are so many and varied, and also because many of them are blurred, fragmentary or have been painted over. The pictures number between 50–200, making it the biggest rock art area in Finland. The main examinations of Saraakallio have been made by amateur archaeologist Pekka Kivikäs. The oldest paintings are circa 6,600 years old. The most common themes in Saraakallio paintings are deer, human, and boat figures. Saraakallio rock paintings are made by using red paint, which is made of hematite-containing soil mixed presumably with blood, urea and eggs.

== See also ==
- Finnish rock art
