= Julma-Ölkky =

- Location within Finland
- Location: Kuusamo
- Coordinates: 65°33′00″N 29°19′42″E
- Type: Lake
- Basin countries: Finland
- Max. length: 2.9 km (1.8 mi)
- Surface area: 25 km^{2} (9.7 sq mi)
- Max. depth: 40 m (130 ft)
- Shore length^{1}: 5.88 km (3.65 mi)
- Surface elevation: 244 m (801 ft)
- ^{1} Shore length is not a well-defined measure.

Julma-Ölkky (also Ylä-Ölkky) is a lake in Kuusamo, North Ostrobothnia, Finland, at the border of Suomussalmi. It is the largest of the three canyon lakes in Finland. It drains through Kiantajärvi and Emäjoki to Oulujärvi and from there through Oulujoki to the Bothnian Bay. Julma-Ölkky is located within the Hossa National Park.
