= Astuvansalmi rock paintings =

Rock paintings in Ristiina, Mikkeli, Finland

Coordinates: 61°26′30″N 027°32′30″E

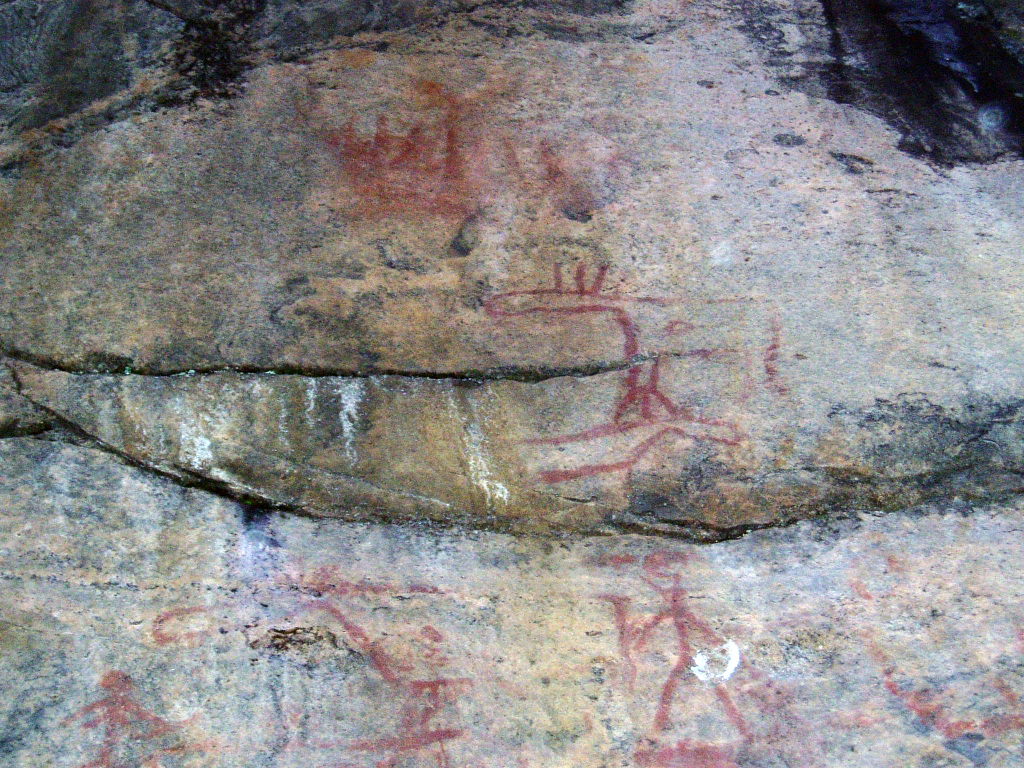
Moose, people and a boat at Astuvansalmi.

The Astuvansalmi rock paintings (Finnish: Astuvansalmen kalliomaalaukset) are located in Ristiina, Mikkeli, Southern Savonia, Finland at the shores of the lake Yövesi, which is a part of the large lake Saimaa. The paintings are 7.7 to 11.8 metres above the water-level of lake Saimaa. The lake level was much higher at the time the rock paintings were made. There are about 70 paintings in the area.

The rock paintings were officially found by the Finnish archaeologist Pekka Sarvas in 1968, though locals knew of them before that.

== Astuvansalmi site ==
The rock where the paintings are located looks like a human head, the form especially visible during wintertime when viewed from the ice of the lake. The rock has presumably been some kind of a cult or ceremony site. The images of moose in Finnish rock paintings may be related to ‘animal ceremonialism’, whereupon the continuity of the hunted species is guaranteed by a ritual in which the animal is sent back to its ‘owner’.

The oldest paintings were made about 3000–2500 BC. They are located at the highest level (about 11 metres). The water level changed rapidly (about 2.5 metres) with the landslide of Vuoksi. Later on the level slowly went down 8 metres to its present level. All the later paintings were made from boats during the different historical water-levels.

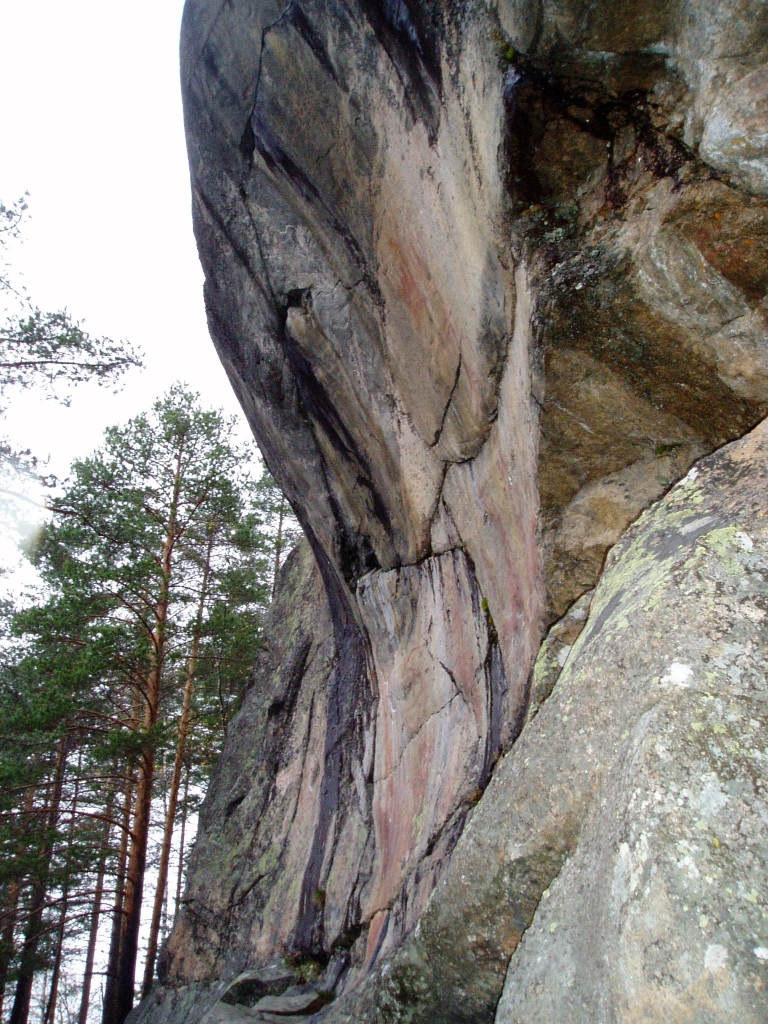
The rock that sheltered Astuvansalmi paintings from erosion.

Other archeological artefacts have been found on the site, at the bottom of the lake, among them small amber statuettes (named Ukko, Akka and Poika). Some animal jewellery was also found, one showing a bear head. The jewellery and statuettes refer to some religious ceremonies held on the site.

Arrowheads have also been found, dated to 2200–1800 BC and 1300–500 BC.

Stone age settlements from about 3300–2800 BC have been found near Astuvansalmi in Heiniemi.

== Motifs ==
The Astuvansalmi rock paintings contain the following pictures: 18 to 20 moose, about as many human figures, tens of hands and animal tracks, 8 to 9 boats, and geometrical figures and pictures that are thought to show a fish and a dog.

The paintings could have a link to the Siberian and North European shamanistic tradition, where the sun was thought to be a deer or a moose running through the sky. The Sámi also had a belief that the sun was a running Cosmic Sun-Reindeer. The people in the paintings were the shamans, who had a contact with the spirit world through trance with their drumming and songs. Shamanism is the oldest cultural tradition of Finland and the North. It has been actively present already in the Paleolithic age.

The moose has traditionally been a very important prey for the people of the north. The moose has also meant the Center of the Universe. Some of the eighteen moose of Astuvansalmi have dots on their heart. All except one is looking west. Some are moving and some are standing.

The boat was an important means of transport in the lake regions of prehistoric Finland. Big boats of skin and wood were already being made before the Vikings started making their big ships. The boats were quite similar to the North American Indian models.

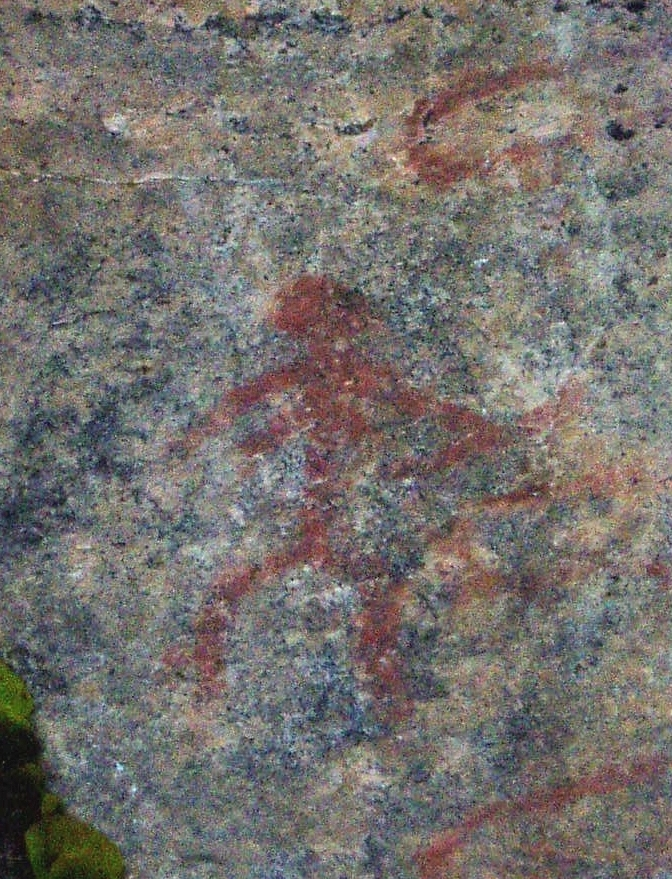
A woman figure with a bow – the Tellervo of Astuva – a rarity among the rock paintings.

The human figures are both shamans and spirits, who are connected with hunting ceremonies. The human figures could also have meant the people who drew them. The rare woman figure holding a bow in her hand is thought to show the mythic "Tellervo", a goddess from the Kalevala mythology, who is thought to be the progenitor of the human race. Women never usually took part in the hunting, that is why she is thought to be of a more divine nature.

== See also ==
- Finnish rock art
