= Kuusa =

Village in Laukaa, Finland

Kuusa Kuusaa
- Village
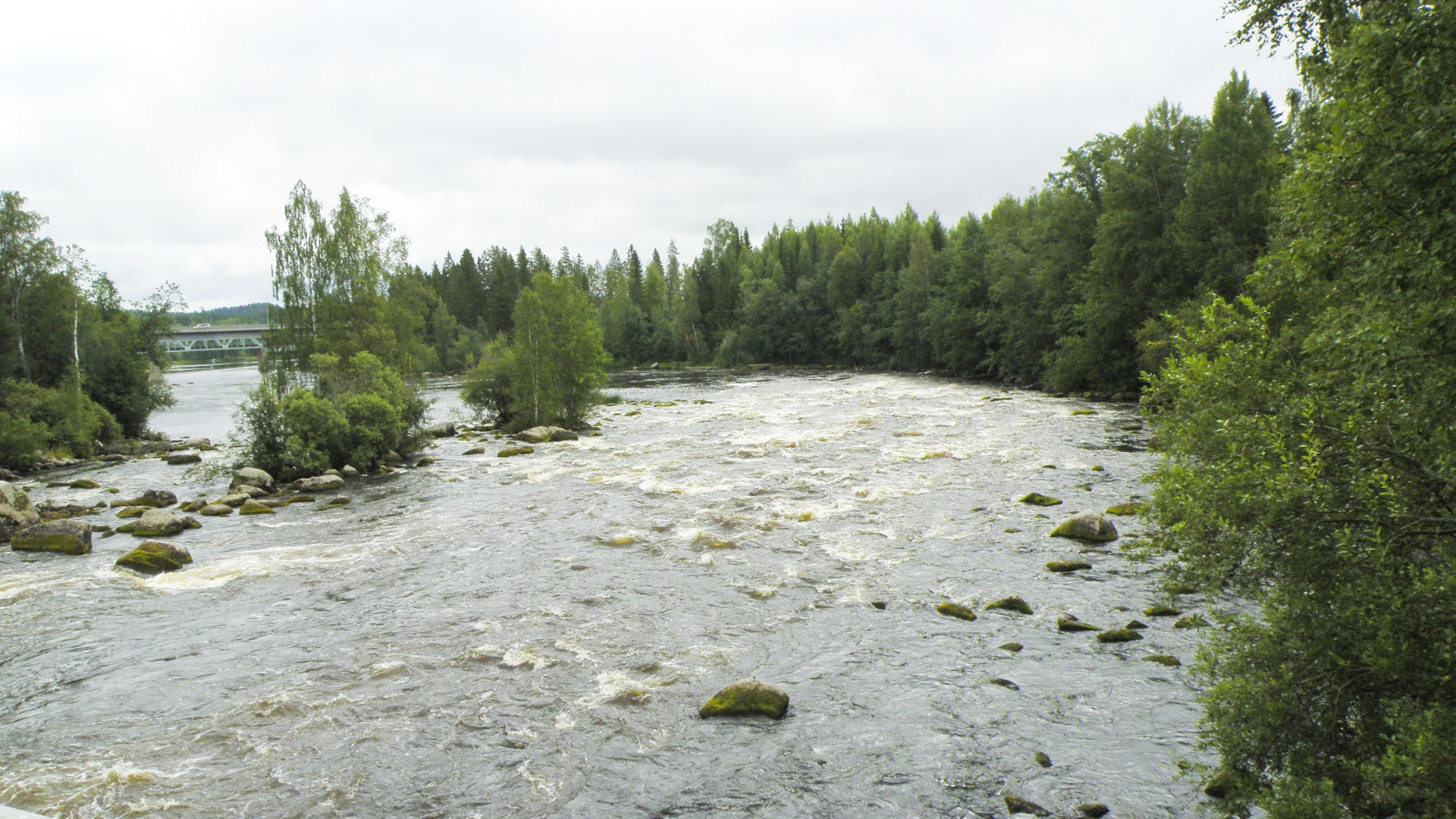
- The Kuusaankoski rapids.

- Location in Central Finland
- Coordinates: 62.461°N 25.940°E
- Country: Finland
- Region: Central Finland
- Sub-region: Jyväskylä sub-region
- Municipality: Laukaa

Population (2013)
  - Total: ~450
- Time zone: UTC+2 (EET)
  - Summer (DST): UTC+3 (EEST)

Kuusa, also known as Kuusaa, is a village in Laukaa, Finland, located 6 km (3.7 mi) north of the municipal administrative center. The village is centered around the Kuusaankoski rapids between the lakes Vatianjärvi and Saraavesi and the Kuusa lock of the Keitele Canal.

The population of Kuusa was approximately 450 in 2013, making it one of the largest villages within the municipality. There are also a few dozen summer residences in the village. The official statistical area (as defined by the municipality) of Kuusa had 598 inhabitants in 2020, however the statistical area also includes other nearby villages such as Leinola.

Kuusa was not an official register village (rekisterikylä), the settlement is located on the borders of five official villages: Pellosniemi (the administrative center of Laukaa), Laukkavirta, Haapavatia, Petruma and Kuusvesi.

== Names and etymology ==
Kuusa is named after the Kuusaankoski rapids, first mentioned in 1504 as part of the toponym Kwsankoskonsarj (modern spelling Kuusa(a)nkoskensaari), referring to some island near the rapids. The initial element is most likely derived from the dialectal word kuusas referring to a small spruce, as the trees are common in the area. Both forms of the village name, Kuusa and Kuusaa, are used by locals; Kuusaa is the older form, while Kuusa is more common today.

== Geography ==
Aside from Saraavesi and Vatianjärvi, there are multiple smaller lakes or ponds in the village, such as Asemalampi, Vähänharjunlampi, Pörrinlampi and Oitinlampi. The most prominent natural features in the village are the Kuusaankoski rapids as well as the hill Oitinmäki, which is part of a terminal moraine formation. Its peak reaches an elevation of 172 m from sea level.

== History ==
The development of Kuusa began in the 18th century, when new farms were established near the rapids on the lands of the nearby older villages.

- The first farms in the area were Saarikko and Itälahti, officially part of Haapavatia, which were formed in 1780 as the 16th-century Peura farm was split into four parts. Saarikko was divided into Ylä-Saarikko and Ala-Saarikko in 1841, while Rantala was separated from Itälahti in 1843.
- The first farms on the lands of Laukkavirta were Keskinen and Karhila, later known as Kuusanmäki and Hietala, which were separated from the Pellinen farm in 1823.
- The village of Pellosniemi, at the time mostly lands of the vicarage of Laukaa, had a tenant farm (torppa) called Mikkola, which was relocated further away from the vicarage and closer to the Kuusaankoski in the 1890s, acquiring the new name Koskela soon after.
- On Petruma's part of the area, the first farm was Varjola, separated from the Finni farm in 1872, while the oldest farm in Kuusvesi's part of Kuusa is Kattala.

Log driving in Laukaa began in the 1830s as the importance of the sawmill industry had begun to grow. Wood was transported through the Kuusaankoski especially to the sawmill at Vaajakoski. In 1838, engineer captain Karl Robert Westling requested permission to establish a sawmill in the Kuusaankoski, however this sawmill was never established due to disagreements over ownership of nearby forests. Despite this, Kuusa kept developing, with the village's modern center forming in the 1870s.

Since the 1880s, there had been plans to connect the Päijänne and Keitele lakes, either by a canal or a railroad. In 1890, it was decided that a railroad was to be built between Jyväskylä and Suolahti, which would also pass through Kuusa. The Jyväskylä–Suolahti railroad was finished in 1898 and a station was opened in Kuusa. The railroad also allowed a post office and three stores to operate in the village. In 1924, a power plant was established in the Kuusaankoski, which provided electricity for the station and to the villages of Petruma and Haapavatia. Passenger traffic at the station continued until the 1980s.

The construction of the Keitele–Päijänne canal, including a lock in Kuusa, began in 1990 to balance Finnish–Soviet trade. Approximately 600 Russian workers were temporarily settled in and around the former Torikka school in nearby Vatia. The canal was finished and officially opened by President Martti Ahtisaari in 1994.

== Education ==
There is a primary school for grades 1–6 in Kuusa. The school was established on lands bought from the Yläsaarikko farm in 1910 after the older Haapavatia school district was divided into two parts (the other being Valkola). Initially providing education only for the upper grades of kansakoulu (the contemporary elementary school system), it was expanded to include lower grades in 1940. By the 1950s, the main building had become decrepit and was replaced with a new building in 1957. The school was officially reformed into a modern peruskoulu in 1974, as was every other school in Laukaa.

An animal husbandry school was established on the lands of the Saarikko and Finni-Uusitalo farms in 1925, with a total area of 260.83 ha (644.5 acres). A weaving school that had operated on the lands of Saarikko since 1905 was relocated to Petäjävesi. In 1944, most of the building was granted to an agricultural school evacuated from the town of Sortavala, as it was occupied by and soon ceded to the Soviet Union. The school became state-owned in 1961 and was relocated to Tarvaala in the municipality of Saarijärvi in 1963.
