= Kuusaankoski =

River rapids in Laukaa, Finland

Coordinates: 62°27′27″N 25°56′14″E

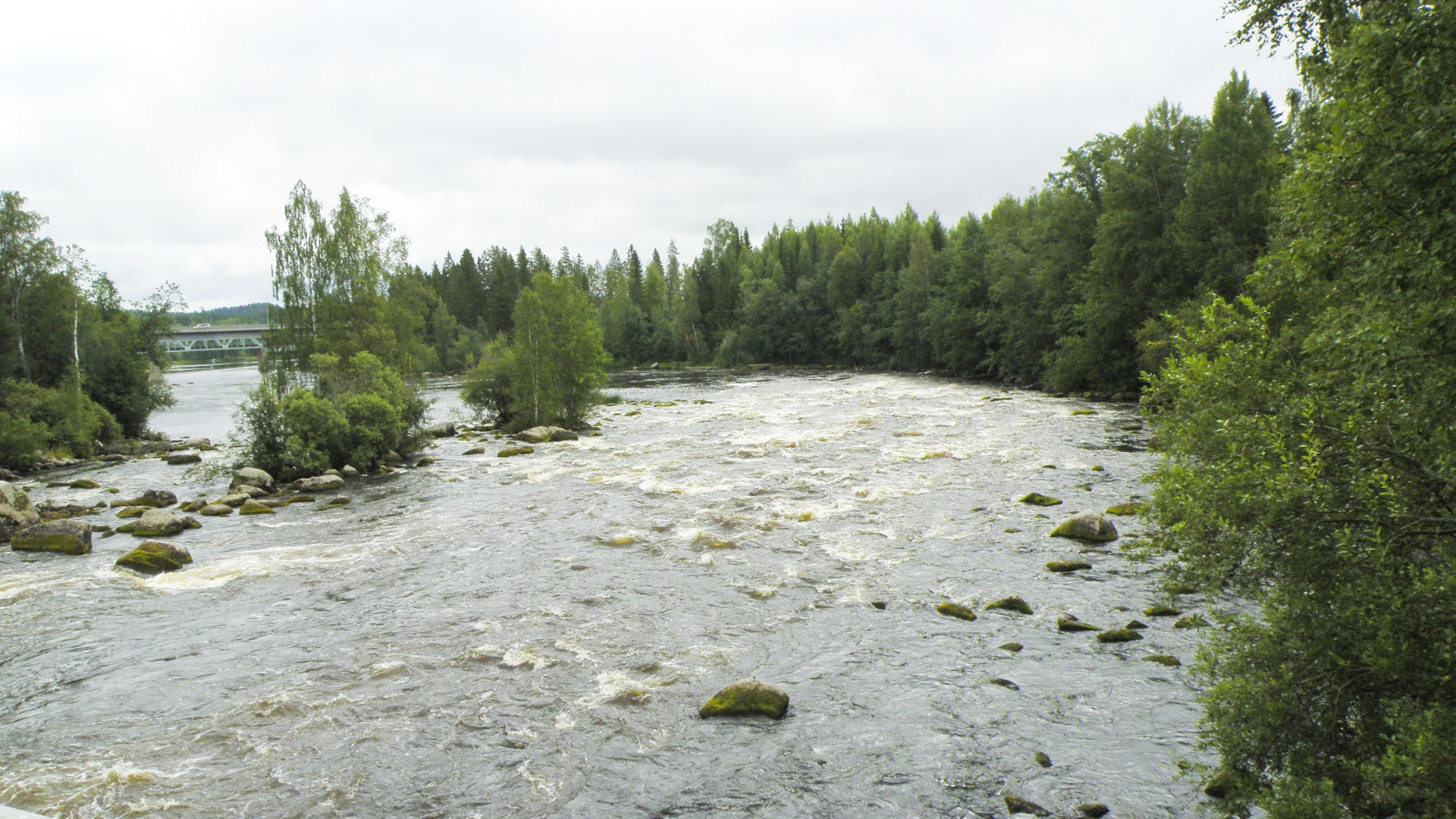
Kuusaankoski rapid

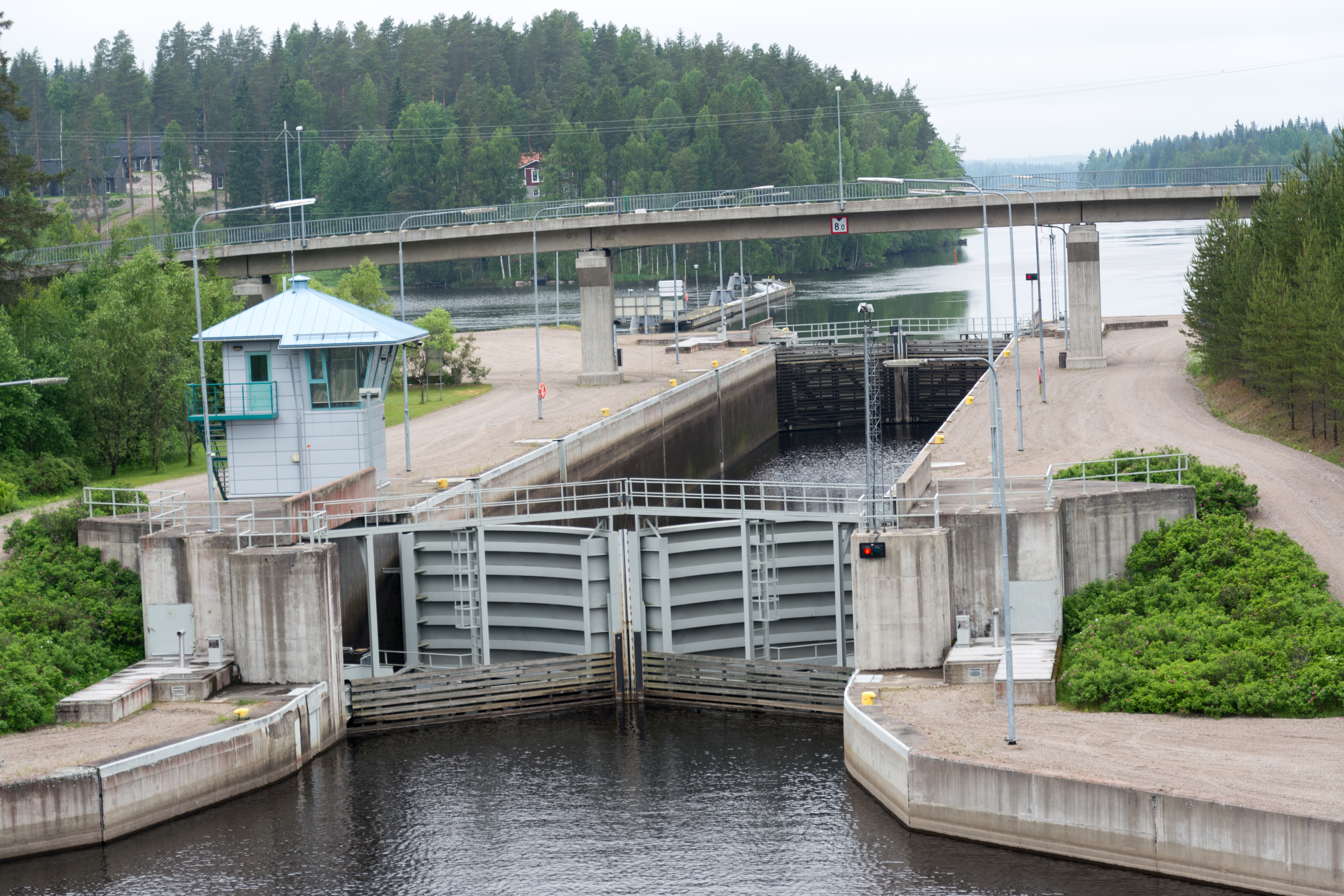
Kuusa Lock

Kuusaankoski (meaning: Kuusaa rapids) is a popular fishing rapids in Central Finland with cultural heritage landscape. The Kuusaankoski rapids are among the best trout rapids in southern Finland.

Kuusaankoski is located on the waterway from lake Vatianjärvi into lake Saraavesi in the village of Kuusa, Laukaa. The mean discharge on the rapid is 90 cubic metres per second (3,200 cu ft/s). Total elevation difference between the two lakes is 4 metres (13 ft). The fishing season is from January 1 to September 10 and from November 16 to December 31. The natural catch species are grayling, brown trout, ide, pike and whitefish. Stocked species are freshwater salmon, whitefish, brown trout and grayling. Lake trout is the most wanted catch on the Kuusaankoski rapids. It is also able to breed in the river naturally. There are big anadromous lake trout from lake Päijänne in the river. During the last few years the biggest lake trout caught from the rapid have weighed about 5 kilograms (11 lb).

In Kuusaankoski there is also a lock of the Keitele Canal, a bridge, scenic views, lodging, restaurants, and other services.
