= Saraavesi =

Lake in Laukaa, Finland

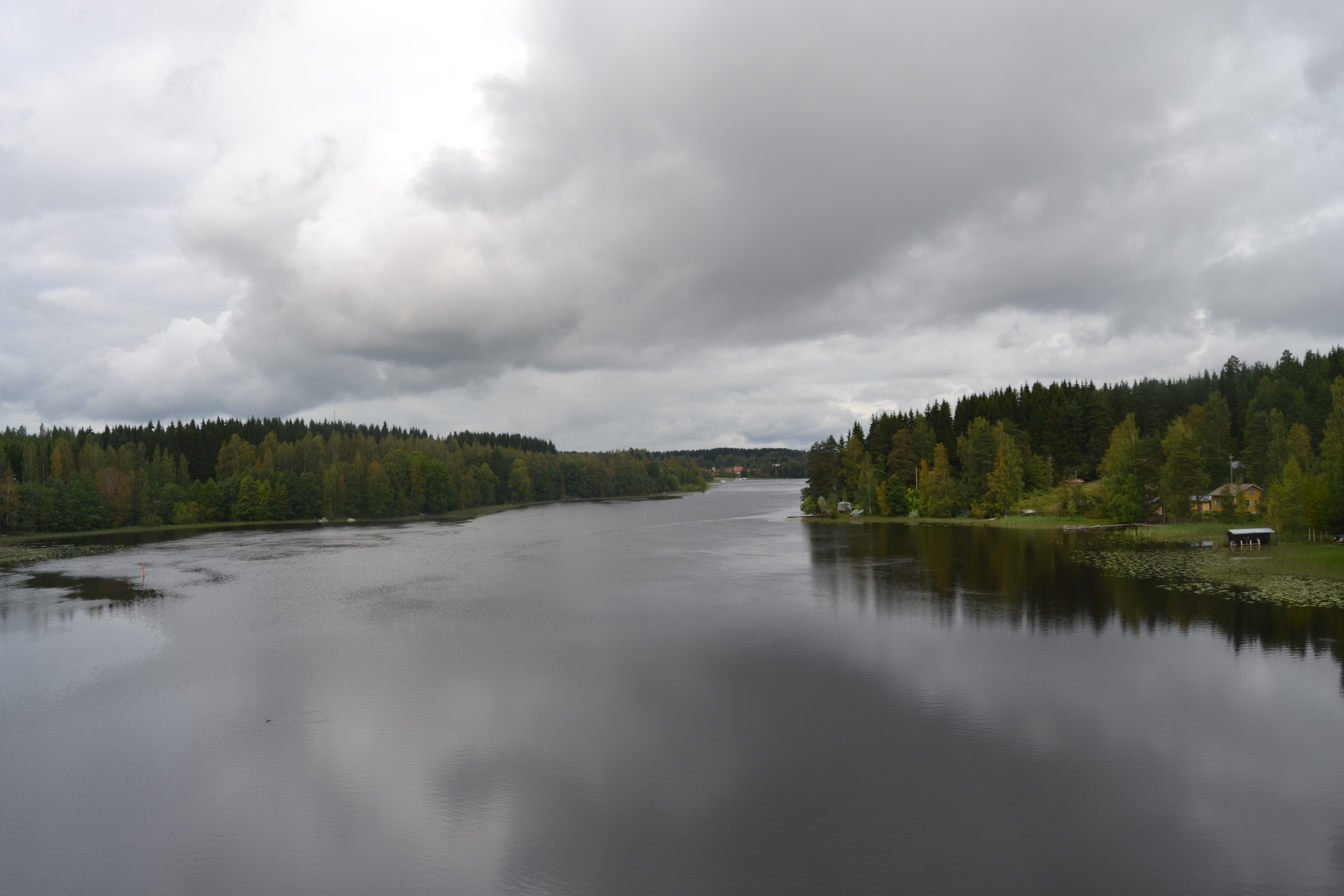
- Saraavesi as seen from Liisanniemi bridge
- Interactive map of Saraavesi
- Coordinates: 62°25′N 025°59′E
- Primary inflows: Kuusaankoski, Tarvaalanvirta
- Primary outflows: Kuhankoski
- Catchment area: Kymijoki
- Basin countries: Finland
- Surface area: 10.488 km^{2} (4.049 sq mi)
- Average depth: 5.79 m (19.0 ft)
- Max. depth: 39.85 m (130.7 ft)
- Water volume: 0.061 km^{3} (49,000 acre⋅ft)
- Shore length^{1}: 62.5 km (38.8 mi)
- Surface elevation: 84.7 m (278 ft)
- Frozen: December–April
- Settlements: Laukaa
- ^{1} Shore length is not a well-defined measure.

Saraavesi is a medium-sized lake in Laukaa, Finland. It flows to lake Leppävesi via Kuhankoski rapids. The lake is part of Keitele Canal, a waterway connecting Lake Keitele and Päijänne. Saraakallio rock paintings are located on the shore of Saraavesi.

Several parts of the lake are included in the Natura 2000 protection program. The site includes the shallow lake Peukaloinen, the Saraakallio cliff, eskers, the Tarvaalanvirta and Kuusaankoski rapids and some cultural heritage places.

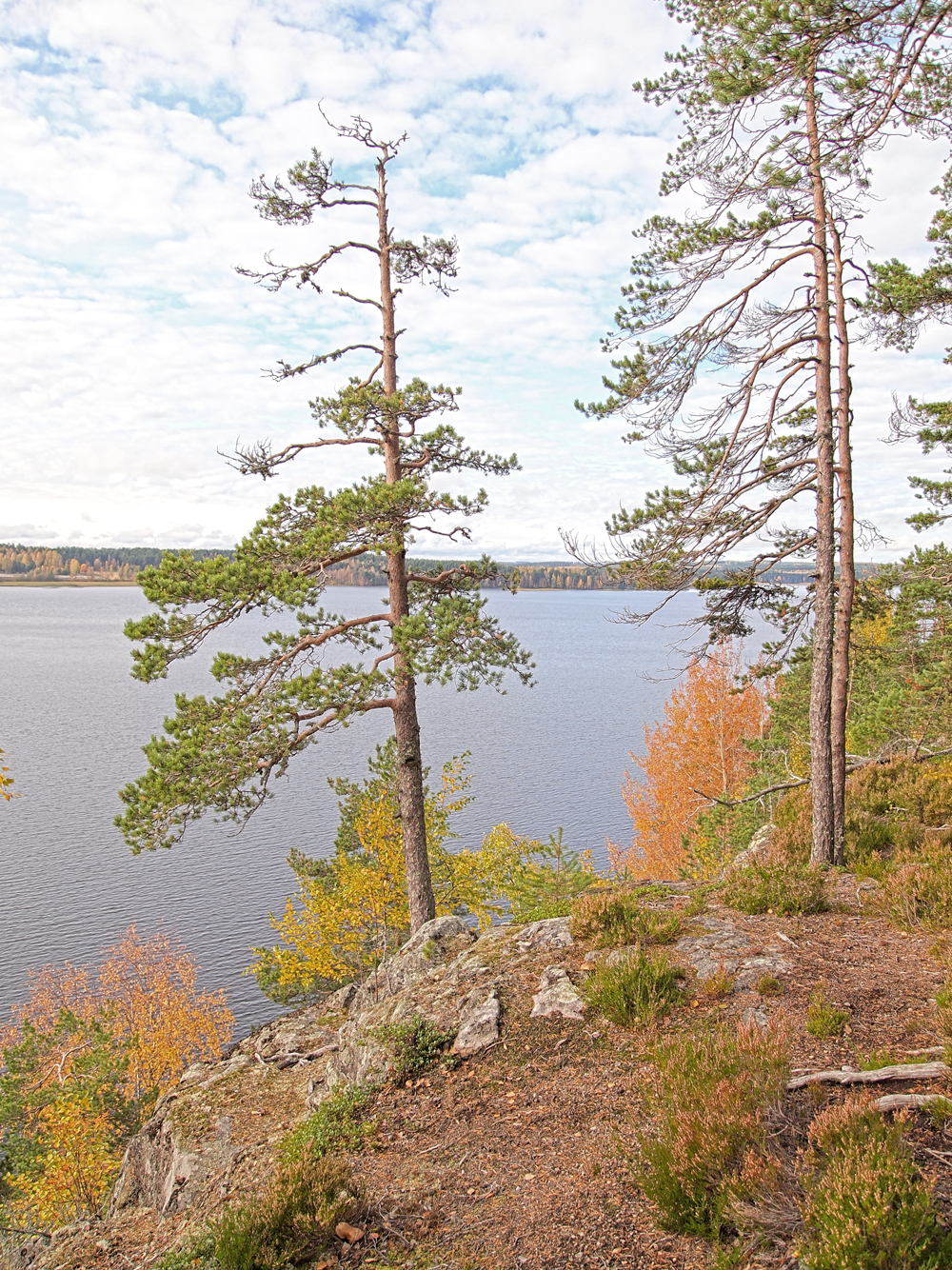
Saraakallio rocks and Saraavesi lake

== See also ==
- List of lakes in Finland
