= Hossa (Finland) =

Village in Suomussalmi, Finland

Coordinates: 65.442°N 29.555°E

Hossa
Region	Kainuu
Sub-region	Kehys-Kainuu
Municipality	Suomussalmi
Population	Around 60
Home page	Hossa (in Finnish)

Hossa is a village in Suomussalmi, Kainuu, Finland. The village is a popular outdoor tourist destination and is known for the oldest rock paintings in Northern Finland, dating back to 1500-2500 BC (Värikallio). In 2017, the 100th anniversary of Finland's declaration of independence, the Hossa National Park was established in the Hossa wilds. The name "Hossa" comes from the Sámi word hoašša, meaning Equisetum hyemale. North of Hossa is the lake Huosiusjärvi, the name of which comes from the Kainuu dialect word for the same plant, huosie.

== Hossa National Park ==
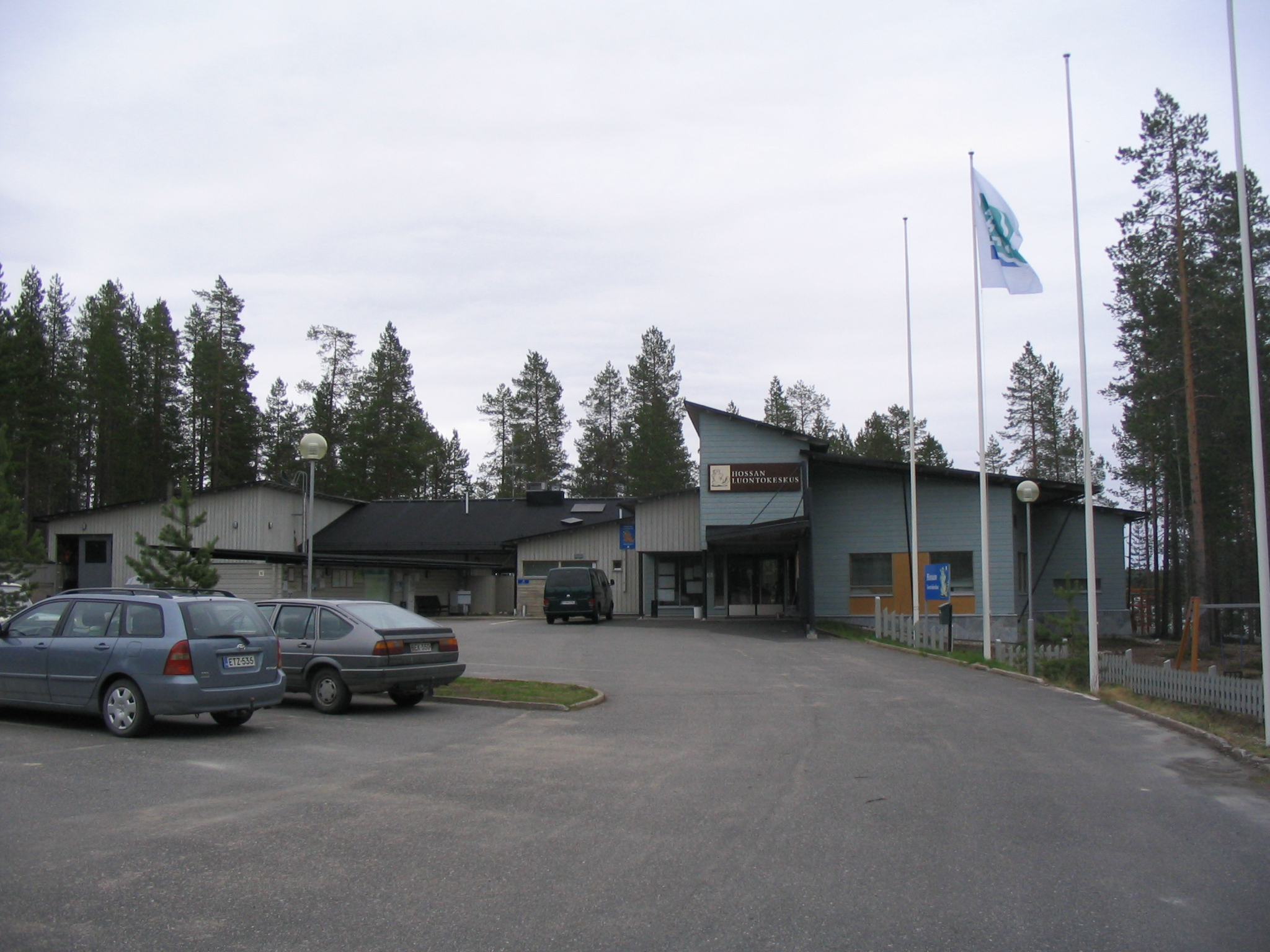
Hossa Visitor Centre

The Hossa National Park was established on June 17, 2017 as the 40th national park in Finland for its 100-year anniversary of Independence.

Before that it was the Hossa Hiking Area (90 km²), established in 1979, was the oldest official hiking area in Finland. It is one of seven hiking areas created under Finland's Outdoor Recreation Act. There are about 90 kilometres of marked trails in the area. Most of the trails are not demanding and lead through ridge and lake-dotted terrain. The trailhead of the 162 km long Eastern Border Hiking Trail (Itärajan retkeilyreitti) is in Hossa National Park.

=== Hossa Visitor Centre ===
Hossa Visitor Centre was opened in 1991 and is situated on the shore of Lake Öllöri. It is managed by Metsähallitus.

== Värikallio cliff art ==
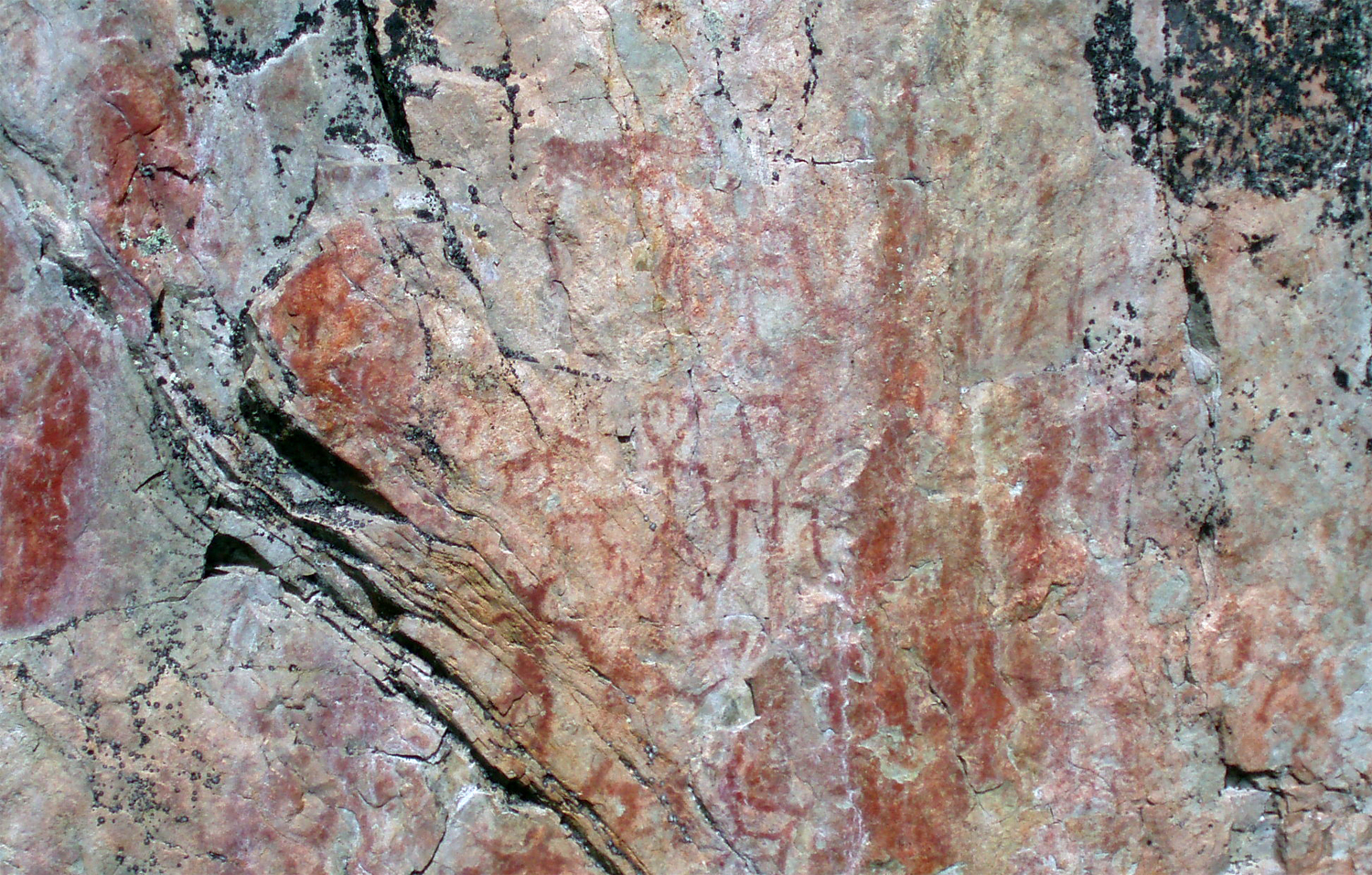
Detail of Värikallio rock painting.

The Värikallio rock paintings are on a cliff near the eastern end of Lake Somerjärvi in the Hossa Hiking Area. Discovered in 1977 by two skiers, it is one of the two northernmost sites of rock art in Finland, as well as one of the largest collections with over 60 figures discerned. The human images at Värikallio are notable for exhibiting triangular heads (seen at only two other sites), and for a human figure with horns. As at other sites, the most numerous images are of animals, including one that may be the only bear depicted in Finnish rock art. Hand print and paw print pictographs are also represented. Another unusual aspect of the Värikallio paintings is the lack of boat images, which are common at other Finnish sites.

== Nature ==
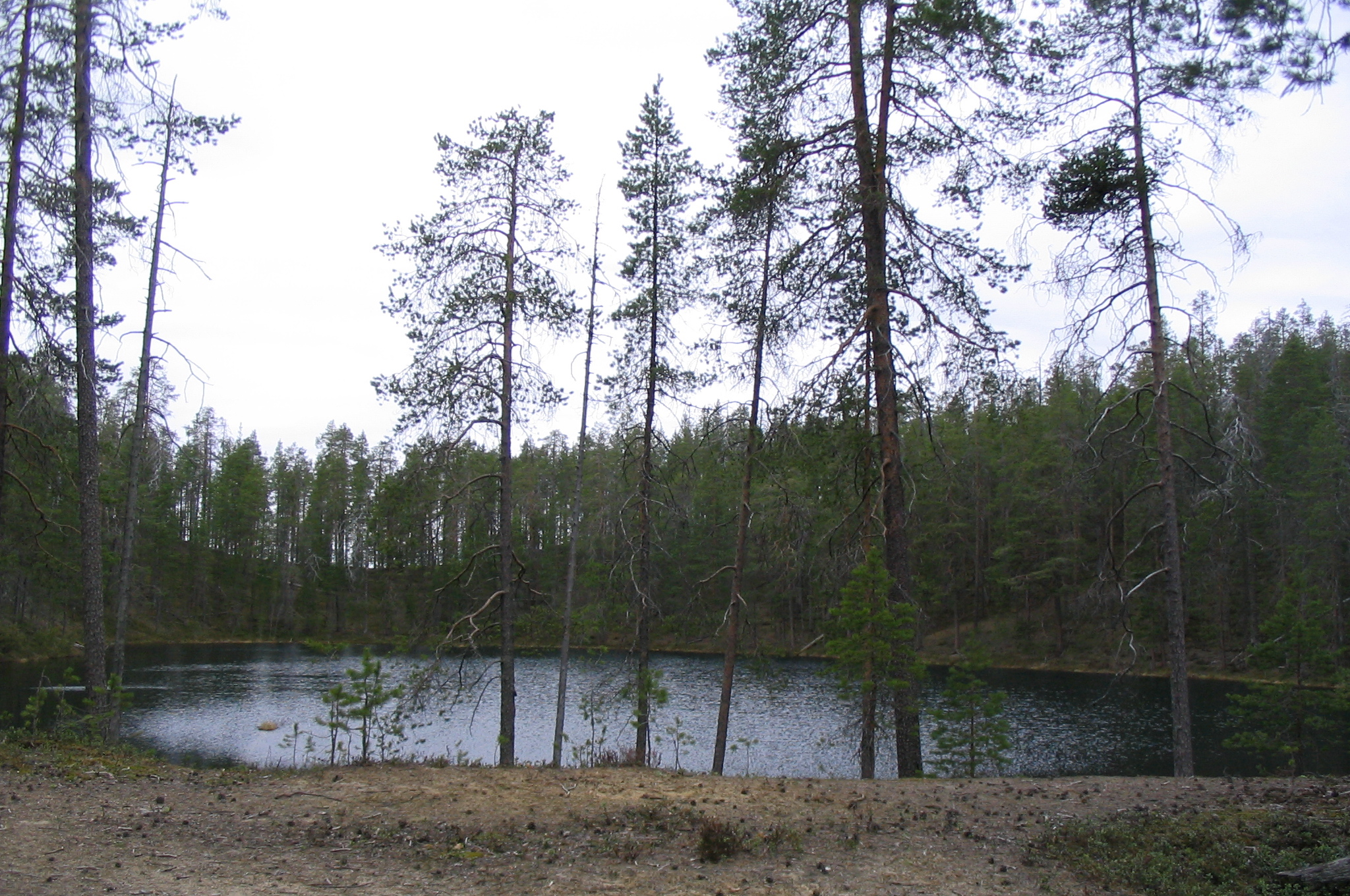
Kettle pond in Hossa Hiking Area

Hossa is at the junction of three waterways, which is the reason for the many areas of flowing water there. There are about 130 lakes and ponds in Hossa and their waters are clear, except for mire ponds, which are dark. The forest in Hossa is characteristic of a northern taiga biome, primarily pine and somewhat barren in appearance. The last Ice Age left its mark in Hossa; for example, the chain of ridges that traverses the area is pocked with kettle ponds created by receding glaciers.
