= Keitele Canal =

Canal in Finland

Coordinates: 62.246806°N 25.886806°E

Keitele Canal is water route in Central Finland. It is about 45 km long. The canal consists of six lakes and five self-service locks.

The canal connects two biggest lakes in Central Finland, Lake Päijänne and Lake Keitele, thus forming a water route of altogether ca. 400 km from the city of Lahti on the southern end to the municipality of Pielavesi in the north.

== History ==
The canal was first proposed at the end of the 19th century. Concrete plans were made in 1962 and again in 1981. Finally the canal was built in 1990–1993 as part of the Finnish-Soviet trade. The Soviet Union owed Finland and paid its debt by building the locks. The project cost 245M Finnish marks.

Originally the canal was intended for the benefit of the wood industry in the region. However, the timber rafting ended in 2002. Since then the canal has been used by private and cruise boats only.

== Tourism ==
There are several companies offering canal and lake cruises in the area, and boat and canoe rentals are available in some areas. Good navigation skill is required as the waters in Central Finland are rocky.

At Vaajakoski Lock there is a restaurant, an art gallery and a swimming beach. At Kuusa Lock there is also accommodation and a theatre. Near the Kapeenkoski Lock are fireplaces, lean-tos and hiking paths in the Kapeenniemi recreational area. The Paatela Lock has a cafe and cruises.

== Locks ==
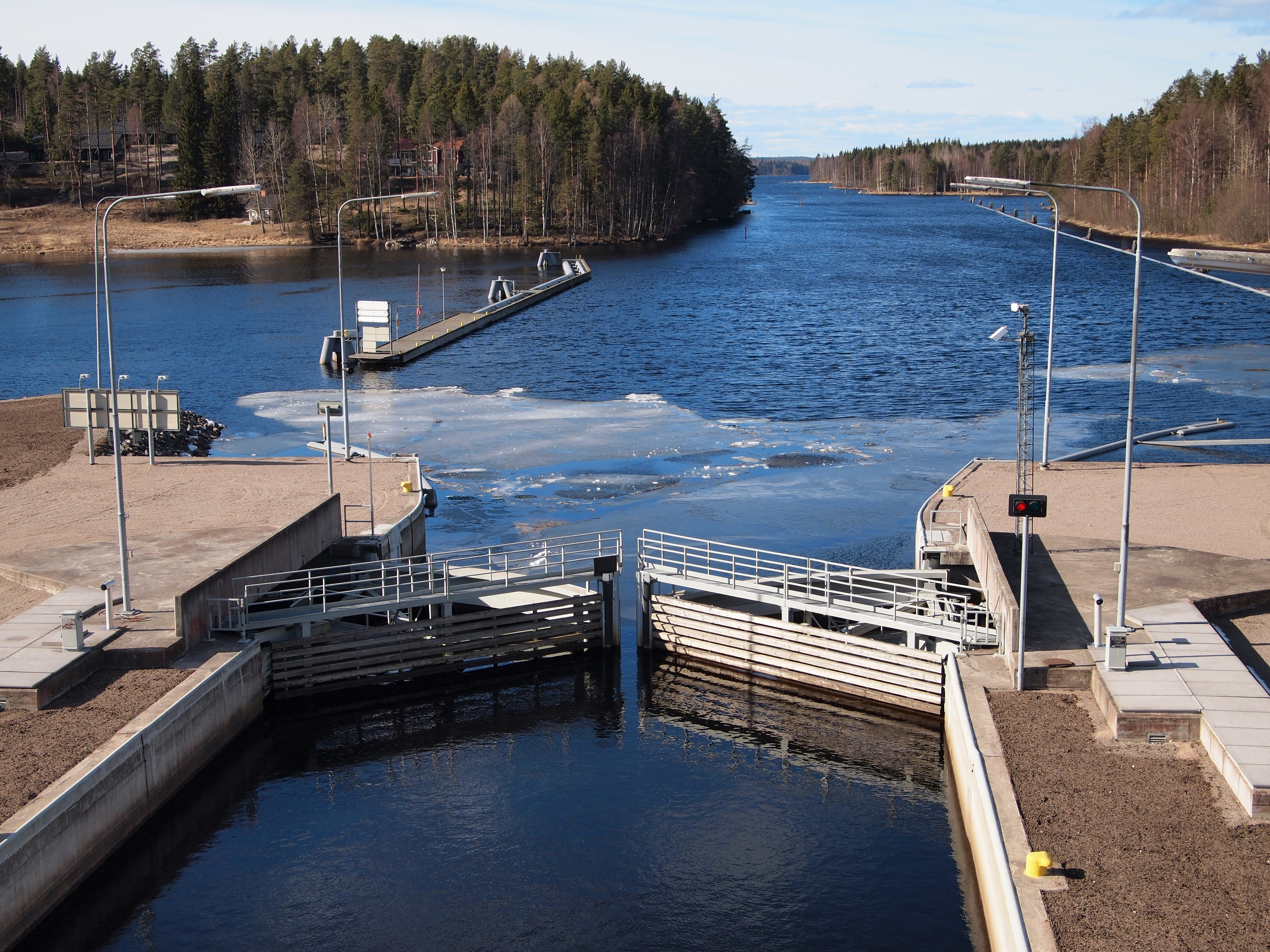

The locks on the canal are designed to accept vessels of a maximum draw of 2.4m, a maximum length of 110m and a maximum width of 11.8m. The locks are self-service locks, and are open from May to September (part-time or by order in October). They can also be controlled remotely.

Locks from south to north:

- Vaajakoski: length 250m, height difference 2,50-2.65m, mast height 5.5m
- Kuhankoski: length 750m, height difference 4-4.10m, mast height 3.5m
- Kuusa: length 350m, height difference 3.90-4.10m, mast height 3.5m
- Kapeenkoski: length 300m, height difference 2.70-3m, mast height 3.5m
- Paatela: length 500 m, height difference 7.40-7.85m, mast height 3.5m

== See also ==
- Article in the Finnish Wikipedia
