= Aaron (given name) =

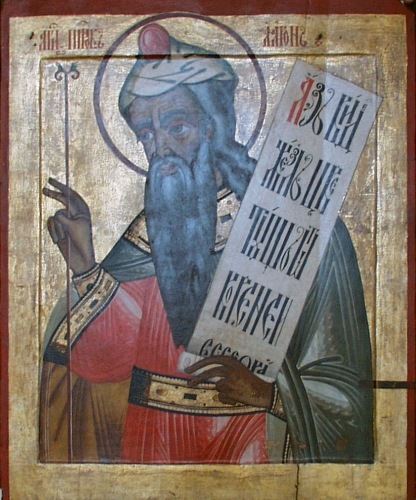
- Russian Icon of Aaron
- Pronunciation: Dutch: [aːˈʔaːrɔn] English: /ˈɛərən, ˈærən/ AIR-ən, AR-ən
- Gender: Male
- Language: English, Exodus 4:14

Origin
- Derivation: Hebrew
- Meaning: "Mountain of strength", "exalted" and "strong"

Other names
- Variant forms: Aharon, Harun, Aronow, Aron

Aaron is an English masculine given name. The 'h' phoneme in the original Hebrew pronunciation "Aharon" (אהרן) is dropped in the Greek, Ἀαρών, from which the English form, Aaron, is derived.

Aaron, the brother of Moses, is described in the Torah, the Quran and the Baha'i Iqan.

The origin of the biblical name is uncertain; however, an Ancient Egyptian origin may indicate "aha rw" meaning "warrior lion", 𓊢𓃭 or from Aaru (meaning "reeds"), the Egyptian heaven ruled by Osiris. 𓇋𓄿𓂋𓅱𓆰𓆰𓆰 According to other different theories, the name could be derived from various Hebrew roots meaning "high mountain", "mountain of strength", "exalted", "enlightened", or "bearer of martyrs". The name Aharon may itself be a variant of Haran, the name given to the older brother of Abraham in the book of Genesis.

The given name was used by Jews and early Christians, then became exclusively Jewish in the Middle Ages, taken up by Gentiles in the 17th century, and popular among both in the end of the 20th century. Aaron was most popular in the United States in 1994 peaking as the 28th most popular name. Aaron is also a Jewish surname. St. Aaron's day is on July 1 and is celebrated in French speaking countries and Poland. The name is generally recognisable around the world as referring to the biblical Aaron and cognate forms in other languages include Aarón in Spanish; Aarão in Portuguese; Aron in Danish, Norwegian, Swedish and Croatian; Árón in Czech and Irish; "ܐܲܗܪܘܿܢ" (Ahron); and Harun (هارون) in Arabic. The variant used in the Russian language is "Ааро́н" (Aaron), with "Аро́н" (Aron) being its colloquial form; diminutives include "Ааро́нка" (Aaronka), "Аро́нка" (Aronka), and "Ро́на" (Rona). The patronymics derived from this first name in Russian are "Ааро́нович" (Aaronovich; masculine) and its colloquial form "Ааро́ныч" (Aaronych), and "Ааро́новна" (Aaronovna; feminine).

Y-chromosomal Aaron is the name given to the hypothesised most recent common ancestor of many Kohanim.

"Aaronite" is a noun referring to the biblical tradition and modern genetic line of Kohanim claiming descent from the biblical Aaron. "Aaronic" is an adjective referring to their traditional priestly attributes such as attention to detail, respect for tradition, and religious dogmatising. For example, biblical texts focussed on rules and traditions such as Leviticus are considered aaronic.

== Pronunciation ==
In its original Hebrew, Aharon (אהרן) is pronounced as three syllables, a-ha-ron. This Hebrew pronunciation is still used in modern Hebrew in Israel today. The Hebrew sound had no direct equivalent in Greek, when Jewish scriptures were translated by Greek-speaking Jews in Alexandria around 200 BCE to form the septuagint, so these translators used a pair of Greek alpha letters to approximate the same sound, "Ἀαρών". This was translated again by St. Jerome from the Greek to the Latin Vulgate as "Aaron" in the fourth century CE. It is thought that the Greeks and Romans would pronounce Aaron similarly to the Hebrew, as the Catholic Latin pronunciation is still defined this way.

The English pronunciation of the biblical Aaron's name was derived by anglicising the Latin during the Church of England's translation of the Authorized King James Bible in 1611 (possibly influenced by older English translations of the bible from Anglo Saxon times onwards). The modern Church of England Pronunciation Guide, the BBC pronunciation guide, the Church of Jesus Christ of Latter-day Saints pronunciation guide, the Oxford English Dictionary, the Longman pronunciation guide, and HarperCollins Biblical Pronunciation Guide all define this modern English pronunciation as /ˈɛərən/ ("air-run", where "air" is the same sound as in "dairy"). This pronunciation is used in the 1956 film The Ten Commandments featuring the biblical Aaron, by UK chief rabbi Jonathan Sacks when speaking in English, and in the BBC production of Shakespeare's Titus Andronicus.

The English name "Aaron" is sometimes confused with the English name "Aron" which is also derived from the biblical Aaron but through translation routes other than the Church of England (Celtic church) and pronounced /ˈærən/ ("a-ran" as in "arrow"). It is further sometimes confused with the names Arran and Aran which are also pronounced /ˈærən/ ("a-ran" as in "arrow") but derive from various sources unrelated to the biblical Aaron such as the Scottish Isle of Arran and Irish Aran Islands. Aeron is another unrelated name, pronounced air-ron, thought to possibly be the name of a Celtic deity who is also the namesake of the popular Aeron chair. Possibly because of this confusion, the common pronunciation in Britain and some other English-speaking countries of Aaron has changed over the last few decades to include /ˈærən/ as an alternative.

== People ==
=== Religion ===
- Aaron (amora), Jewish scholar
- Aaron of Aleth (died 552), saint, hermit, abbot and monk in Brittany
- Aaron of Auxerre (died 807), a bishop of Auxerre locally venerated as a saint
- Aaron of Caerleon (died 304), British martyr and saint
- Aaron of Pinsk (died 1841), rabbi and author of Tosafot Aharon
- Aaron (abbot) (died 1052), abbot of St. Martin, Cologne, Germany
- Aaron (Copt), a Miaphysite Coptic saint
- Aaron (saint), a saint of the Coptic Church
- Aaron the Illustrious (or Aaron of the nuts) (born 4th century), an Armenian saint
- Aaron Abiob (1535–1605), Turkish rabbi
- Aaron He-Haver ben Yeshuah Alamani, 12th-century rabbi, physician, and poet
- Aaron Bancroft (1755–1839), American clergyman
- Aaron Burr Sr. (1716–1757), Presbyterian minister and college educator
- Aaron Buzacott (1800–1864), British missionary and author
- Aaron Lucius Chapin (1817–1892), American minister
- Aaron Chorin (1766–1844), Hungarian rabbi and religious pioneer
- Aaron Cleveland (1715–1757), Canadian clergyman
- Aaron Cupino, Greek talmudist
- Aaron Demsky, Israeli professor of biblical history
- Aaron B. Grosh (1803–1884), American minister
- Aaron Abba ben Johanan ha-Levi (died 1643), Ukrainian rabbi
- Aaron Abraham ben Baruch Simeon ha-Levi, Jewish kabbalist
- Aaron Hart (1670–1756), British rabbi
- Aaron Hazzan, Jewish religious writer
- Aaron Samuel Kaidanover (1614–1676), Polish-Lithuanian rabbi
- Aaron Karfunkel (died 1816), Bohemian rabbi
- Aaron Landes (1929–2014), American rabbi
- Aaron Lapapa (1590–1674), Turkish Oriental rabbi and Talmudist
- Aaron Leibowitz, American-Israeli rabbi
- Aaron Jean-Marie Cardinal Lustiger (1926–2007), Archbishop Emeritus of Paris
- Aaron Margalita (1663–1725), Polish rabbi
- Aaron J. Messing (1840–1916), German-American rabbi
- Aaron Monsonego (1929–2018), Moroccan rabbi
- Aaron Moses ben Mordecai, Prussian cabalistic writer
- Aaron D. Panken (1964–2018), American rabbi and academic administrator
- Aaron Parry, American rabbi
- Aaron Elijah Pumpianski (1835–1893), Russian rabbi and author
- Aaron Rakeffet-Rothkoff (born 1937), American Professor of Rabbinic Literature
- Aaron Raskin, American rabbi and writer
- Aaron Riches (born 1974), Canadian theologian
- Aaron Schechter, American Haredi rabbi
- Aaron Scotus (late 10th century–1052), Irish abbot and musician
- Aaron Crossley Hobart Seymour (1789–1870), Anglo-Irish religious author and hymn-writer
- Aaron Tänzer (1871–1937), Austrian-German rabbi
- Aaron Teitelbaum (born 1947), American chief rabbi
- Aaron Twersky of Chernobyl (1784–1871), Ukrainian rabbi
- Aaron Walden (1835–1912), Polish-Jewish Talmudist, editor, and author
- Aaron Wilson (priest) (1589–1643), Anglican clergyman
- Aaron Wise (rabbi) (1844–1896), American rabbi
- Aaron Worms (1754–1836), German chief rabbi
- Teófilo Vargas Seín (1921–2021), Puerto Rican religious leader renamed Aarón

==== Book of Mormon people ====
- Aaron (Lamanite), a Lamanite mentioned in the Book of Mormon
- Aaron (Nephite), the Nephite missionary mentioned in the Book of Mormon

=== Nobility ===
- Aaron the Upright or Harun al-Rashid (ca. 763–809), Abbasid caliph
- Aaron II (Khazar) (10th century)
- Aron of Bulgaria (10th-century), Bulgarian noble

=== Science ===
- Aaron Afia, Greek scientist, mathematician, philosopher, and physician
- Aaron Alward (1828–1886), Canadian physician and political figure
- Aaron D. Ames, American engineering researcher and professor
- Aaron T. Beck (1921–2021), American psychiatrist, founder of cognitive-behavior therapy
- Aaron Belkin (born 1966), American political scientist, researcher and professor
- Aaron Bodansky (1887–1960), Russian-American biochemist
- Aaron L. Brody (1930–2021), American food scientist
- Aaron Carroll, American pediatrician and professor
- Aaron Cicourel, American sociologist and professor
- Aaron Ciechanover (born 1947), Israeli Nobel laureate biologist
- Aaron Clauset, American computer scientist
- Aaron Cohen (1931–2010), deputy director of NASA
- Aaron Cohen-Gadol (born 1970), American neurological surgeon and professor
- Aaron Devor (born 1951), Canadian sociologist and sexologist
- Aaron M. Ellison (born 1960), American ecologist, photographer, sculptor, and writer
- Aaron Esterson (1923–1999), British psychiatrist
- Aaron Fenster, Canadian medical physicist
- Aaron S. French (1823–1902), American industrialist and philanthropist
- Aaron Goldberg (1917–2014), American botanist and parasitologist
- Aaron Solomon Gumperz (1723–1769), Jewish-German physician and scholar
- Aaron Halfaker (born 1983), American research scientist
- Aaron Hawkins (born 1970), American engineer
- Aaron Ismach (1920–2007), American scientist and inventor
- Aaron Klug (1926–2018), British chemist and astrophysicist, Nobel laureate
- Aaron B. Lerner (1920–2007), American physician, researcher, and professor
- Aaron Mair, epidemiological-spatial analyst and environmentalist
- Aaron Mannes (born 1970), American researcher
- Aaron Marcus (born 1943), American computer scientist
- Aaron E. Miller, American neurologist
- Aaron McDuffie Moore (1863–1923), American medical doctor
- Aaron Mujajati (born 1975), Zabian physician, author, and entrepreneur
- Aaron Novick (1919–2000), American biologist
- Aaron D. O'Connell (born 1981), American experimental quantum physicist
- Aaron Panofsky, American sociologist of science
- Aaron Parsons (born 1980), American astrophysicist
- Aaron Rosanoff (1878–1943), Russian-American psychiatrist
- Aaron John Sharp (1904–1997), American botanist and bryologist
- Aaron Shatkin (1934–2012), American scientist and professor
- Aaron Shirley (1933–2014), American physician and civil rights activist
- Aaron Franklin Shull (1881–1961), American zoologist and professor
- Aaron Sloman, artificial intelligence scientist
- Aaron Louis Treadwell (1866–1947), American zoologist and professor
- Aaron Valero (1913–2000), Israeli physician and educator
- Aaron E. Wasserman (1920–2015), American food scientist
- Aaron Wildavsky (1930–1993), American political scientist
- Aaron D. Wyner (1939–1997), American information theorist
- Aaron Yazzie (born 1986), American mechanical engineer

=== Arts and entertainment ===
==== Actors and comedians ====
- Aaron Abrams (born 1978), Canadian actor and writer
- Aaron Agassi (born 1988), Filipino actor and singer'
- Aaron Altaras (born 1995), German actor
- Aaron Aryanpur (born 1977/78), American stand-up comedian, artist, and voice actor
- Aaron Ashmore (born 1979), Canadian actor
- Aaron Aziz (born 1976), Singaporean actor, singer, and film director
- Aaron Badgley, Canadian radio host and music journalist
- Aaron Carotta (born 1977), American television personality, travel blogger, and news reporter
- Aaron Craze, English celebrity chef
- Aaron Michael Davies (born 1984), American actor
- Aaron Dismuke (born 1992), American voice actor
- Aaron Douglas (born 1971), Canadian actor
- Aaron Eckhart (born 1968), American actor
- Aaron Fa'aoso (born 1976), Australian actor, screenwriter, and producer
- Aaron Faulls (born 1975), American television personality, filmmaker, musician, and marine conservationist
- Aaron Frazier (born 1979), American actor
- Aaron Goldsmith (born 1983), American sportscaster
- Aaron Harber, American television talk show host
- Aaron Heffernan (born 1990), Irish actor
- Aaron Hill (born 1983), American actor
- Aaron Himelstein (born 1985), American actor
- Aaron Christian Howles (born 1993), American actor
- Aaron Jakubenko (born 1988), Australian actor
- Aaron Jeffcoate (born 1993), British actor
- Aaron Jeffery, New Zealand-Australian actor
- Aaron Karo (born 1979), American stand-up comedian and author
- Aaron Katersky (born 1975), American radio news journalist
- Aaron Kaufman (born 1982), American television personality, racing driver, and businessman
- Aaron Kearney (born 1971), Australian broadcaster, journalist, and sports commentator
- Aaron Lazar, American actor, artist, and entrepreneur
- Aaron Lebedeff (1873–1960), Yiddish theatre star
- Aaron Lohr (born 1976), American actor and singer
- Aaron McCargo Jr. (born 1971), American chef, television personality, and television show host
- Aaron McCarthy, Australian TV presenter
- Aaron McCusker (born 1978), Northern Irish actor
- Aaron L. McGrath, Australian television and film actor
- Aaron Meeks (born 1986), American actor
- Aaron Michael Metchik (born 1980), American actor, writer, and director
- Aaron Moloisi (born 1979), South African actor and television presenter
- Aaron O'Connell (born 1986), American model and actor
- Aaron Osborne (1947–1995), American modern dancer and dance teacher
- Aaron Paul (born 1979), American actor
- Aaron Pedersen (born 1970), Australian television and film actor
- Aaron Pierre (born 1994), English actor
- Aaron Poole (born 1977), Canadian actor
- Aaron Robison, British ballet dancer
- Aaron Sagers, American television personality and entertainment journalist
- Aaron Sanders (born 1996), American actor
- Aaron Schoenke, American film and television actor, screenwriter, director, editor, producer, and cinematographer
- Aaron Schwartz (born 1948/1949), Canadian actor, director, photographer, and copyright lawyer
- Aaron Schwartz (born 1981), American actor
- Aaron Sidwell (born 1988), English actor and singer
- Aaron Sillis (born 1983), English dancer and choreographer
- Aaron Smith (born 1976), American magician and writer
- Aaron D. Spears (born 1971), American actor
- Aaron Stanford (born 1976), American actor
- Aaron Staton, American actor
- Aaron Swartz, British actor and theatre and television director
- Aaron Takahashi, American actor
- Aaron Taylor-Johnson (born 1990), English actor
- Aaron Tolson, American tap dancer
- Aaron Walpole (born 1979), Canadian musical actor
- Aaron Webber (born 1989), Canadian stage and screen actor
- Aaron White (playwright) (born 1980), American actor and director
- Aaron Williams, American ventriloquist
- Aaron Wolf, American actor, writer, and director
- Aaron Yan (born 1985), Taiwanese actor and singer
- Aaron Yonda (born 1973), American comedian, writer, actor, director, and YouTuber
- Aaron Yoo (born 1979), American actor
- Aaron Zebede, Panamanian stage actor, director, and producer

==== Artists and animators ====
- Aaron Augenblick, American animator, director, and producer
- Aaron Beebe, American artist and curator
- Aaron Berkman (1900–1991), American painter
- Aaron Betsky (born 1958), American art, architecture, and design critic
- Aaron Blaise (born 1968), American painter, animator, film director, and art instructor
- Aaron Bohrod (1907–1992), American artist
- Aaron Bolot (1900–1989), Crimean-Australian architect
- Aaron Carpenter (born 1975), Canadian visual artist
- Aaron Chang (born 1956), American photographer
- Aaron Curry (born 1972), American painter and sculptor
- Aaron Curry (1974–2016), American graffiti artist known professionally as ORFN
- Aaron Dickson (born 1980), Irish artist and photographer
- Aaron Douglas (1899–1979), American painter, illustrator, and visual arts educator
- Aaron Fink (born 1955), American artist
- Aaron Fowler (born 1988), American contemporary interdisciplinary artist
- Aaron Henry Furlong, American jewelry designer
- Aaron Gelman (1899–1970), American artist
- Aaron Gilbert (born 1979), Cuban-American artist
- Aaron Goodelman (1890–1978), American sculptor
- Aaron Harry Gorson (1872–1933), American artist
- Aaron Green (1917–2001), American architect
- Aaron Hawks (born 1973), American multidisciplinary artist
- Aaron Horkey, American illustrator
- Aaron Horvath (born 1980), American animator, television writer, producer, and director
- Aaron Huey (born 1975), American photographer, explorer, activist, and storyteller
- Aaron Flint Jamison (born 1979), American conceptual artist and associate professor
- Aaron Krach (born 1972), American artist, writer, and journalist
- Aaron Kraten (born 1974), American mixed media artist
- Aaron Kuder, American comic book artist and writer
- Aaron Kuffner (born 1975), American conceptual artist
- Aaron Li-Hill (born 1986), Canadian visual artist and muralist
- Aaron Long (born 1990), Canadian animator and filmmaker
- Aaron Lopresti (born 1964), American comic book artist
- Aaron Messiah (1858–1940), French architect
- Aaron Nagel, American painter and trumpet player
- Aaron Nelson-Moody (born 1967), Canadian squamish carver
- Aaron Padilla (born 1974), American artist and art educator
- Aaron Edwin Penley (1806–1870), English painter
- Aaron Rose Philip (born 2001), Antiguan-American model, artist, and author
- Aaron Rapoport (born 1954), American photographer
- Aaron Renier, American comic artist
- Aaron Resnick (1914–1986), American architect
- Aaron Schwarz, American architect
- Aaron Draper Shattuck (1832–1928), American painter
- Aaron Shikler (1922–2015), American artist
- Aaron Siskind (1903–1991), American photographer
- Aaron Sopher (1905–1972), American artist
- Aaron Sowd (born 1970), American comic book creator, writer, and artist
- Aaron Spangler (born 1971), American sculptor and printmaker
- Aaron Springer, American cartoonist, animator, writer, director, storyboard artist, layout artist, and voice actor
- Aaron Tucker (born 1982), Canadian digital artist, writer, and educator
- Aaron Wexler (born 1974), American artist
- Aaron Williams, American cartoonist
- Aaron Young (born 1972), American artist

==== Filmmakers ====
- Aaron Bergeron, American television writer and producer
- Aaron Brookner (born 1981), American film director and scriptwriter
- Aaron Burns (born 1985), American film producer, actor, film director, screenwriter, film editor, and cinematographer
- Aaron I. Butler, American film and television editor and producer
- Aaron Albert Carr (born 1963), Laguna Pueblo-Navajo documentary film maker and author
- Aaron Cohen (born 1976), Israeli-American writer, director, actor, author, and soldier
- Aaron Covington (born 1984), American screenwriter and sound designer
- Aaron Ehasz (born 1973), American screenwriter and television producer
- Aaron Glascock, American sound editor
- Aaron Godfred, American film, television, and digital producer
- Aaron Guzikowski, American screenwriter
- Aaron Harberts (born 1973), American television writer and producer
- Aaron Harvey (born 1980), American film director and writer
- Aaron Hillis, American writer, film critic, director, film festival programmer, and curator
- Aaron Hoffman (1880–1924), American writer and lyricist
- A. E. Hotchner, American editor, novelist, playwright and biographer
- Aaron Johnston (writer), American author, comics writer, and film producer
- Aaron Douglas Johnston, American filmmaker
- Aaron Katz (born 1981), American filmmaker
- Aaron Kaufman (born 1974), American film producer and director
- Aaron Kopp, American cinematographer and film director
- Aaron Korsh (born 1966), American television producer, writer, and investment banker
- Aaron Kozak (born 1983), American playwright and filmmaker
- Aaron Lipstadt (born 1952), American film director, television director, and producer
- Aaron Lubarsky, American documentary filmmaker
- Aaron Lustig (born 1956), American film and television actor
- Aaron McGruder (born 1974), American writer, cartoonist, and producer
- Aaron Moorhead (born 1987), American film director, producer, cinematographer, editor, and actor
- Aaron Norris (born 1951), American stunt performer, director, actor, and producer
- Aaron Ohlmann, American filmmaker
- Aaron Paquette (born 1974), Canadian writer, artist, speaker, and politician
- Aaron Platt (born 1981), American film director and cinematographer
- Aaron Posner, American playwright and theater director
- Aaron Pugliese, American writer, director, and producer
- Aaron Rhyne, American video and projection designer
- Aaron Rochin, American sound engineer
- Aaron Rose, American film director, artist, exhibition curator, and writer
- Aaron Ruben (1914–2010), American television director and producer
- Aaron Ruell (born 1976), American director, photographer, and actor
- Aaron Ryder, American film producer
- Aaron Saidman (born 1974), American creator-developer, documentary filmmaker, and television producer
- Aaron Schneider (born 1965), American filmmaker and cinematographer
- Aaron Shure, American television writer, director, and producer
- Aaron Simpson (born 1971), American animation producer
- Aaron Smith, co-creator of Australian TV series You Can't Ask That
- Aaron Sorkin (born 1961), American screenwriter, producer and playwright
- Aaron Spelling (1923–2006), American film and television producer
- Aaron Stell (1911–1996), American film editor
- Aaron Rahsaan Thomas, American television and film screenwriter and producer
- Aaron Waltke (born 1984), American screenwriter, television producer, and showrunner
- Aaron Wilson, Australian film director and writer
- Aaron Woodley (born 1971), Canadian film director and screenwriter
- Aaron Woolfolk (born 1969), American film director, screenwriter, producer, and playwright
- Aaron Zelman, American television writer and producer

==== Musicians ====
- Aaron Accetta (born 1971), American record producer, songwriter, and musician
- Aaron Aedy, rhythm guitarist of English doom metal band Paradise Lost
- Aaron Atayde (born 1986), Filipino DJ, TV host, and sports anchor
- Aaron Avshalomov (1894–1965), Russian composer
- Aaron Axelsen, American DJ
- Aaron Barker (born 1953), American singer-songwriter
- Aaron Bedard (born 1969), American musician
- Aaron Bell (musician) (1921–2003), American jazz double-bassist
- Aaron Benward (born 1973), American singer-songwriter, actor, film and television producer, and music supervisor
- Aaron Bertram (born 1981), American trumpet player
- Aaron Bing, American jazz saxophonist
- Aaron Black, lead singer of the band Capitol Offense
- Aaron Bow (born 1992), American record producer and songwriter
- Aaron Bridgers (1918–2003), American jazz pianist
- Aaron A. Brooks (born 1964), American rock musician, drummer, producer, and composer
- Aaron Brown (musician) (born 1980), Australian-American violinist and composer
- Aaron Bruno (born 1978), American singer, songwriter, and musician
- Aaron Buchanan, lead singer for the band Aaron Buchanan & The Cult Classics
- Aaron Burckhard (born 1963), American musician and drummer
- Aaron Carter (1987–2022), American singer
- Aaron Cassidy (born 1976), American composer
- Aaron Cohen (actor), American rapper
- Aaron Cole (born 1999), American recording artist and songwriter
- Aaron Collins (singer) (1930–1997), American singer
- Aaron Cometbus (born 1968), American musician, songwriter, roadie, and magazine editor
- Aaron Copland (1900–1990), American composer, composition teacher, writer, and conductor
- Aaron Crabb, Christian musician
- Aaron Crawford (musician), American drummer for the band Flee the Seen
- Aaron Cupples, Australian film composer, record producer, and musician
- Aaron Dai (born 1967), American composer and pianist
- Aaron Dalbec, American guitarist
- Aaron Davis (born 1990), British rapper and actor known professionally as Bugzy Malone
- Aaron Deer (born 1980), American songwriter and multi-instrumentalist
- Aaron Dessner (born 1976), American musician, songwriter, record producer, and record label founder
- Aaron Detroit, American musician, zine writer, and music journalist
- Aaron Diehl (born 1985), American jazz pianist
- Aaron Dilloway (born 1976), American musician
- Aaron Dugan (born 1977), American guitarist, composer, and songwriter
- Aaron Dworkin (born 1970), American violinist and music educator
- Aaron Embry (born 1975), American songwriter and record producer
- Aaron Eshuis, American songwriter and record producer
- Aaron Espe (born 1981), American singer-songwriter, instrumentalist, and record producer
- Aaron Fink, American guitarist for the band Breaking Benjamin
- Aaron Ford, American drummer for the band ...And You Will Know Us by the Trail of Dead
- Aaron Freeman (born 1970), American singer, songwriter
- Aaron Fruchtman, American composer, conductor, musicologist
- Aaron Funk (born 1975), breakcore artist most popularly known as Venetian Snares
- Aaron Gervais, Canadian composer
- Aaron Gillespie (born 1983), drummer/vocalist of UnderOath and live drummer of Paramore
- Aaron Goldberg (born 1974), American jazz pianist
- Aaron Goldstein (musician) (born 1983), Canadian musician, songwriter, and record producer
- Aaron Goodvin, Canadian-American country music singer and songwriter
- Aaron Green (born 1994), American musician and record producer known professionally as Mr. Green
- Aaron Hall (singer) (born 1964), American singer and songwriter
- Aaron Harris (drummer) (born 1977), American musician, composer, and drummer for the band Isis
- Aaron Harris, American drummer for the band Islands
- Aaron Heick (born 1961), American saxophonist and woodwind player
- Aaron James (organist) (born 1986), Canadian organist and musicologist
- Aaron Krister Johnson, American composer, musician, and teacher
- Aaron M. Johnson (born 1991), American jazz saxophonist and bandleader
- Aaron Jones, member of the Scottish band Old Blind Dogs
- Aaron Kelly (singer) (born 1993), American singer
- Aaron Jay Kernis (born 1960), American composer
- Aaron Keyes (born 1978), American Christian musician
- Aaron Kwak (born 1993), American singer and sub-vocalist of NU'EST
- Aaron Kwok (born 1965), Hong Kong singer, dancer and actor
- Aaron LaCrate, American music producer, recording artist, DJ, fashion designer, and film director
- Aaron Leaney, Canadian saxophonist and composer
- Aaron Levinson, American producer, musician, composer, and record label owner
- Aaron Lewis (musician) (born 1972), member of band Staind
- Aaron Lines (born 1977), Canadian country musician
- Aaron Marsh, American singer, songwriter, musician, and record producer
- Aaron McMillan (1977–2007), Australian pianist
- Aaron Neville (born 1941), American singer
- Aaron North (born 1979), American musician
- Aaron Novik (born 1974), American composer, clarinetist, and bandleader
- Aaron Parks (born 1983), American jazz pianist
- Aaron Parrett (born 1967), American musician, author, printer, and educator
- Aaron Pauley (born 1988), American singer, songwriter, and musician
- Aaron Pfenning (born 1983), American multi-instrumentalist, singer-songwriter, and record producer
- Aaron Pilsan (born 1995), Austrian pianist
- Aaron Pritchett (born 1970), Canadian country musician
- Aaron-Carl Ragland (1973–2010), American electronic dance musician
- Aaron Richmond (1895–1965), American performing arts manager, pianist, impresario, and educator
- Aaron Rimbui (born 1979), Kenyan pianist, keyboardist, bandleader, producer, festival curator, and radio host
- Aaron Robertson, American drummer for the band Myka Relocate
- Aaron Robinson (born 1970), American composer, conductor, and musicologist
- Aaron Rosand (1927–2019), American violinist
- Aaron Rossi (born 1980), American drummer for the band Prong
- Aaron Roterfeld, Austrian musician and songwriter
- Aaron Sachs (1923–2014), American jazz saxophonist and clarinetist
- Aaron Sarlo, American singer-songwriter and comedian
- Aaron Schroeder (1926–2009), American songwriter and music publisher
- Aaron Scott (musician) (born 1956), American composer and jazz drummer
- Aaron Seeman, American composer, pianist, and accordion player
- Aaron Shaw, American bagpipe player in the Wicked Tinkers
- Aaron Shearer (1919–2008), American guitarist
- Aaron Sheehan (born 1975), American vocal tenor and music professor
- Aaron Shust (born 1975), American Christian musician
- Aaron Smith (born 1950), American drummer and percussionist
- Aaron Smith (born 1985), American rapper known professionally as Shwayze
- Aaron Smith, American music producer and DJ
- Aaron Smith, guitarist for the American band Brazil
- Aaron Solowoniuk (born 1974), member of band Billy Talent
- Aaron James Sorensen (born 1966), Canadian musician, writer, producer, and film director
- Aaron Soul, British singer and songwriter
- Aaron Sperske, American drummer
- Aaron Sprinkle (born 1974), American singer, songwriter, and record producer
- Aaron Stainthorpe (born 1968), English singer and songwriter
- Aaron Sterling (born 1980), American drummer, producer, engineer, and session musician
- Aaron Stern, American musician
- Aaron Lee Tasjan (born 1986), American singer-songwriter, guitarist, and record producer
- Aaron Tippin (born 1958), American country musician and record producer
- Aaron Tokona (1975–2020), New Zealand guitarist and singer
- Aaron Tsang (born 1985), Canadian composer
- Aaron Turner (born 1977), American musician, singer, graphic artist, and record producer
- Aaron Tveit, (born 1983), American singer and film and theatre actor
- Aaron Walker (1910–1975), American blues musician, composer, songwriter, and multi-instrumentalist known professionally as T-Bone Walker
- Aaron Watson (born 1977), American country singer and songwriter
- Aaron Weinstein, American musician
- Aaron Williams (composer) (1731–1776), Welsh teacher, composer, and music compiler
- Aaron Williams (born 1993), American DJ, radio host, web personality, event producer, entrepreneur, and marketing executive, known professionally as DJ A-Tron
- Aaron Charles Wills (born 1974), aka P-Nut member of band 311
- Aaron Dontez Yates (born 1971), American rapper, also known as Tech N9NE
- Aaron Zigman (born 1963), American composer, producer, arranger, songwriter, and musician

=== Politics and business ===
==== Businessmen ====
- Aaron of Lincoln (c. 1125–1186), English Jewish financier believed to be the wealthiest person in Norman England
- Aaron Aaronsohn (1876–1919), Romanian-born Jewish scientist, traveller, entrepreneur, and politician
- Aaron Bay-Schuck (born 1981), American music industry executive, CEO and co-chairman of Warner Records
- Aaron Buerge (born 1974), American banker, businessman, and television personality
- Aaron Buff (1911–1994), American chair maker
- Aaron Columbus Burr (1808–1882), American jeweler
- Aaron Cardozo (1762–1834), English businessman
- Aaron Commodore (1819/1820–1892), American businessman, politician, and former slave
- Aaron T. Demarest (1841–1908), American automobile manufacturer
- Aaron Lufkin Dennison (1812–1895), American watchmaker and businessman
- Aaron Dignan (born 1979), American businessman and writer
- Aaron Fechter (born 1953), engineer and founder of ShowBiz Pizza Place
- Aaron Feuerstein (1925–2021), American industrialist, philanthropist, and CEO of Malden Mills
- Aaron Fish (producer) (born 1962), Canadian entrepreneur
- Aaron Fleishhacker (1820–1898), German-American businessman
- Aaron Frenkel (born 1957), Israeli businessman and investor
- Aaron Fulkerson, American information technology businessman and founder of MindTouch, Inc.
- Aaron Gural (1917–2009), American chairman of Newmark & Company
- Aaron Hart (1724–1800), Canadian businessman
- Aaron Hillegass (born 1969), American businessman
- Aaron Iba (born 1983), American computer programmer and entrepreneur
- Aaron Isaac (1730–1817), Jewish seal engraver and merchant
- Aaron Jack (born 1975), American businessman and politician
- Aaron Kirman, American real estate agent and investor
- Aaron Kirunda (born 1985), Ugandan social entrepreneur and public figure
- Aaron Kitchell (1744–1820), American blacksmith and politician
- Aaron Koblin (born 1982), American digital media artist and entrepreneur
- Aaron LaBerge, American technology executive
- Aaron Lansky (born 1955), American businessman
- Aaron Levie (born 1984), founder and CEO of Box
- Aaron Lopez (1731–1782), Portuguese merchant, slave trader, and philanthropist
- Aaron Montgomery Ward (1843–1913), American businessman
- Aaron Mushimba (1946–2014), Namibian businessman
- Aaron Naparstek (born 1970), American businessman, founder of Streetsblog
- Aaron Nusbaum (1859–1936), American entrepreneur and philanthropist
- Aaron Olmsted (1753–1806), American sea captain and businessman
- Aaron Patzer (born 1980), American internet entrepreneur
- Aaron Peasley (1775–1837), American button maker
- Aaron W. Plyler (1926–2016), American businessman and politician
- Aaron Pott, American winemaker and businessman
- Aaron Rasmussen, American game designer and co-founder of MasterClass
- Aaron Rathborne (1571/1572–1605-1622), English land surveyor and mathematician
- Aaron Rose (pioneer) (1813–1899), American pioneer of Michigan and Oregon, founder of Roseburg, Oregon
- Aaron Y. Ross (1829–1922), American gold miner, stage coach driver, and train guard
- Aaron Rubashkin (1927/1928–2020), Russian-American businessman
- Aaron Russo (1943–2007), American entertainment businessman, film producer, director, and political activist
- Aaron Selber Jr. (1927–2013), American businessman and philanthropist
- Aaron Shapiro, American entrepreneur, marketing executive, and investor
- Aaron Silverman, American chef and restaurateur
- Aaron Simpson (producer) (born 1972), British businessman, entrepreneur, and film producer
- Aaron Skonnard, American businessman and CEO of Pluralsight
- Aaron Sojourner (born 1972), American economist and professor
- Aaron Solomon, Jewish merchant
- Aaron S. Stern (1854–1920), American clothing firm executive and theatrical producer
- Aaron Swartz (1986–2013), American writer, internet campaigner, and entrepreneur
- Aaron Sweet (1854–1937), Canadian merchant and politician
- Aaron Traywick (1989–2018), American businessman and life extension activist
- Aaron Willard (1757–1844), British-American entrepreneur, industrialist, and clock designer
- Aaron S. Williams, American international development expert and diplomat

==== Politicians and judges ====
- Aaron Ben-zion ibn Alamani, 12th century Egyptian judge
- Aaron Austin (1745–1829) justice of the Connecticut Supreme Court
- Aaron Ayers (1836–1900), New Zealand politician, hairdresser, and tobacconist
- Aaron Aylward, American politician
- Aaron Barschak (born 1966), English politician
- Aaron Bean (born 1967), American politician
- Aaron Bell (born 1980), British politician
- Aaron Benavot, American global education policy analyst
- Aaron T. Bliss (1837–1906), American politician
- Aaron Alpeoria Bradley (1815–1881), American lawyer and politician
- Aaron Bernstine (born 1984), American politician
- Aaron Broussard (born 1949), American politician
- Aaron V. Brown (1795–1859), American politician
- Aaron Bugeja, Maltese judge
- Aaron Burr (1756–1836), American politician
- Aaron Chapman (politician) (1771–1850), English writer and politician
- Aaron Cheruiyot (born 1986), Kenyan politician
- Aaron Clark (1787–1861), American politician
- Aaron Clausen (born 1977), American politician
- Aaron Van Schaick Cochrane (1858–1943), American politician
- Aaron Coleman (born 2000), American politician
- Aaron H. Conrow (1824–1865), American politician and soldier
- Aaron H. Cragin (1821–1898), American politician
- Aaron Curry (politician) (1887–1957), English politician
- Aaron Ago Dagang (born 1958), Malaysian politician
- Aaron Davidson (born 1971), American lawyer and businessman
- Aaron Dillaway (born 1971), Australian politician
- Aaron Dixon (born 1949), American activist and captain of the Black Panther Party
- Aaron Edlin (born 1967), American economist and lawyer
- Aaron Farrugia (born 1980), Maltese politician
- Aaron Ford (Mississippi politician) (1903–1983), American politician
- Aaron Ford (Nevada politician) (born 1972), American lawyer and politician
- Aaron Forst, American politician
- Aaron Freeman (politician), American lawyer and politician
- Aaron Frey (born 1978), American lawyer and politician
- Aaron Fricke (born 1962), American gay rights activist and author
- Aaron Friedberg (born 1956), American political scientist
- Aaron Fussell (1923–2014), American politician and educator
- Aaron Gadama, Malawian politician
- Aaron B. Gardenier (1848–1909), American lawyer and politician
- Aaron Gilmore (born 1973), New Zealand politician
- Aaron Goodrich (1807–1887), American lawyer, jurist, and diplomat
- Aaron H. Grout (1879–1966), American judge and political figure
- Aaron Gutierrez, American politician
- Aaron Hackley Jr. (1783–1868), American politician and slaveholder
- Aaron Harding (1805–1875), American politician and slaveholder
- Aaron Harlan (1802–1868), American politician
- Aaron Harper (born 1967), Australian politician
- Aaron Hawkins (born 1983/1984), New Zealand politician
- Aaron Henry (1922–1997), American civil rights leader and politician
- Aaron Hobart (1787–1858), American politician
- Aaron Jackson (activist), American human rights and environmental activist
- Aaron Jaffe (born 1930), American politician and lawyer
- Aaron Jernigan (1813–1891), American adventurer and politician
- Aaron Ling Johanson (born 1980), American politician
- Aaron Kaufer (born 1988), American politician
- Aaron Klein (born 1979), American-Israeli political commentator, journalist, strategist, writer, and senior advisor
- Aaron Klemz, American politician
- Aaron Krauter (born 1956), American politician
- Aaron Shenk Kreider (1863–1929), American politician
- Aaron J. Levy (1881–1955), American lawyer and politician
- Aaron Leland (1761–1832), American minister and politician
- Aaron Libby (born 1983), American politician
- Aaron Lieberman, American politician
- Aaron Lyle (1759–1825), American politician
- Aaron Matson (1770–1855), American politician
- Aaron V. McAlvay (1847–1915), American judge
- Aaron Manasses McMillan (1895–1980), American politician
- Aaron McWilliams (born 1983), American politician
- Aaron Michlewitz, American politician
- Aaron Miller (politician) (born 1987), American politician and educator
- Aaron Mosher (1881–1959), Canadian labour leader and trade unionist
- Aaron Albert Mossell (1863–1951), Canadian lawyer
- Aaron Motsoaledi (born 1958), South African politician
- Aaron Ogden (1756–1839), American soldier, lawyer, and politician
- Aaron Pargas Ojeda, Puerto Rican politician
- Aaron Mike Oquaye (born 1944), Ghanaian barrister and politician
- Aaron Ortiz, American politician
- Aaron Osmond (born 1969), American politician
- Aaron Peña (born 1959), American attorney and politician
- Aaron F. Perry (1815–1893), American lawyer and politician
- Aaron Persky (born 1962), American attorney and judge
- Aaron Peskin (born 1964), American elected official
- Aaron Peterson (born 1970), American politician
- Aaron Pike (born 1981), American activist
- Aaron Pilkington (born 1991), American politician
- Aaron Porter (born 1985), English politician
- Aaron Reardon (politician), American politician and lobbyist
- Aaron Regunberg (born 1990), American progressive activist and politician
- Aaron Rehkop (1891–1967), American politician and U.S. Army soldier
- Aaron Rhodes (born 1949), American-German human rights activist and writer
- Aaron Ringel, American political advisor
- Aaron Ringera (born 1950), Kenyan lawyer and judge
- Aaron B. Rollins (1818–1878), American politician
- Aaron Rule (born 1967), Australian politician
- Aaron Sangala (born 1958), Malawian politician
- Aaron Sapiro (1884–1959), American cooperative activist, lawyer, and major leader in the farmers movement
- Aaron A. Sargent (1827–1887), American journalist, lawyer, politician, and diplomat
- Aaron W. Sawyer (1818–1882), American judge
- Aaron Schock (born 1981), American politician
- Aaron A. F. Seawell (1864–1950), American politician and jurist
- Aaron Shaw (representative) (1811–1887), American politician
- Aaron Smith (conspirator) (died 1701), English lawyer involved in plots
- Aaron Soltz (1872–1945), Soviet politician and lawyer
- Aaron Dwight Stevens (1831–1860), American abolitionist
- Aaron Stewart (1845–1910), British trade unionist
- Aaron Stiles (born 1979), American politician and lawyer
- Aaron Stonehouse (born 1990), Australian politician
- Aaron Titlow (1857–1923), American lawyer and politician
- Aaron D. Truesdell, American politician
- Aaron Twerski (born 1939), American lawyer and professor
- Aaron Vail (1796–1878), American diplomat
- Aaron Valent (born 1997), German politician
- Aaron Van Camp (1816–1892), American espionage agent
- Aaron Vanderpoel (1799–1870), American politician
- Aaron Vega (born 1970), American politician
- Aaron E. Waite (1813–1898), American judge and politician
- Aaron Walters (1809–1889), American politician
- Aaron Ward (representative) (1790–1867), American lawyer and politician
- Aaron S. Watkins (1863–1941), American politician and Methodist minister
- Aaron L. Weisman (born 1965), American attorney
- Aaron Woodruff (1762–1817), American politician
- Aaron Woods (1950–2025), American politician
- Aaron Abel Wright (1840–1922), Canadian politician
- Aaron Zebley, American attorney and FBI special agent
- Aaron S. Zelman (1946–2010), American gun rights advocate, author, and founder of Jews for the Preservation of Firearms Ownership
- Aaron Zundelevich (1852–1923), Jewish-Russian revolutionary narodnik

=== Military ===
- Aaron Anderson (Medal of Honor) (1811–1886), Union Navy sailor and Medal of Honor recipient
- Aaron Baker (1610–1683), English colonial agent
- Aaron Bank (1902–2004), U.S. Army colonel
- Aaron Beng (born 1982), Singaporean rear-admiral
- Aaron Bradshaw Jr. (1894–1976), U.S. Army major general
- Aaron Bushnell (1998–2024), U.S. Air Force serviceman who self-immolated in front of the Embassy of Israel in Washington, D.C.
- Aaron Daggett (1837–1938), U.S. Army officer
- Aaron R. Dean II, U.S. Army brigadier general
- Aaron R. Fisher (1895–1985), U.S. Army soldier
- Aaron Fuller (1738–1816), American military official
- Aaron Hankinson (1735–1806), American military officer and politician
- Aaron R. Hudson (died 1907), American soldier and Medal of Honor recipient
- Aaron Katz (Soviet general) (1901–1971), Soviet Red Army major general
- Aaron S. Lanfare (1824–1875), American Union Army first lieutenant and Medal of Honor recipient
- Aaron S. Merrill (1890–1961), American U.S. Navy rear admiral
- Aaron Prupas, U.S. Air Force major general
- Aaron Fletcher Stevens (1819–1887), U.S. Army officer and politician
- Aaron B. Tompkins (1844–1931), U.S. Army soldier, Medal of Honor recipient
- Aaron Tozer (1788–1854), English Royal Navy captain
- Aaron Ward (sailor) (1851–1918), U.S. Navy officer

=== Sports ===
==== Baseball ====
- Aaron Altherr (born 1991), American baseball player
- Aaron Ashby (born 1998), American baseball pitcher
- Aaron Barrett (born 1988), American baseball pitcher
- Aaron Bates (born 1984), American baseball player
- Aaron Blair (born 1992), American baseball pitcher
- Aaron Boone (born 1973), American baseball player, manager
- Aaron Brooks (born 1990), American baseball pitcher
- Aaron Bummer (born 1993), American baseball pitcher
- Aaron Civale (born 1995), American baseball pitcher
- Aaron Clapp (1856–1914), American baseball player
- Aaron Cook (born 1979), American baseball pitcher
- Aaron Crow (born 1986), American baseball pitcher
- Aaron Cunningham (born 1986), American baseball player
- Aaron Durley (born 1993), American baseball player
- Aaron Fletcher (born 1996), American baseball pitcher
- Aaron Fultz (born 1973), American baseball pitcher
- Aaron Guiel (born 1972), Canadian baseball player
- Aaron Harang (born 1978), American baseball pitcher
- Aaron Heilman (born 1978), American baseball pitcher
- Aaron Herr (born 1981), American baseball player
- Aaron Hicks (born 1989), American baseball player
- Aaron Hill (baseball) (born 1982), American baseball player
- Aaron Holbert (born 1973), American baseball player
- Aaron Judge (born 1992), American baseball player
- Aaron Laffey (born 1985), American baseball pitcher
- Aaron Ledesma (born 1971), American baseball player
- Aaron Looper (born 1976), American baseball pitcher
- Aaron Loup (born 1987), American baseball player
- Aaron Meade (born 1988), American baseball pitcher and coach
- Aaron Miles (born 1976), American baseball player
- Aaron Myette (born 1977), Canadian baseball pitcher
- Aaron Nola (born 1993), American baseball player
- Aaron Northcraft (born 1990), American baseball pitcher
- Aaron Pointer (born 1942), American baseball player
- Aaron Poreda (born 1986), American baseball player
- Aaron Rakers (born 1977), American baseball pitcher
- Aaron Robinson (baseball) (1915–1966), American baseball player
- Aaron Rowand (born 1977), American baseball player
- Aaron Russell (baseball) (1879–1949), American baseball player
- Aaron Sabato (born 1999), American baseball player
- Aaron Sanchez (baseball) (born 1992), American baseball pitcher
- Aaron Scheffer (born 1975), American baseball pitcher
- Aaron Sele (born 1970), American baseball pitcher
- Aaron Senne (born 1987), American baseball player
- Aaron Albert Silvera (1935–2002), American baseball player
- Aaron Slegers (born 1992), American baseball pitcher
- Aaron Small (born 1971), American baseball pitcher
- Aaron Stevens (baseball), American college baseball coach
- Aaron Taylor (baseball) (born 1977), American baseball pitcher
- Aaron Thompson (baseball) (born 1987), American baseball pitcher
- Aaron Ward (baseball) (1896–1961), American baseball player
- Aaron Whitefield (born 1996), Australian baseball player
- Aaron Wilkerson (born 1989), American baseball pitcher
- Aaron Zavala (born 2000), American baseball player

==== Basketball ====
- Aaron Aban (born 1982), Filipino basketball player
- Aaron Anderson (basketball) (born 1991), American basketball player
- Aaron Bailey-Nowell (born 1981), New Zealand basketball player
- Aaron Best (basketball) (born 1992), Canadian basketball player
- Aaron Black (basketball) (born 1996), Filipino-American basketball player
- Aaron Bradshaw (born 2003), American basketball player
- Aaron Brooks (basketball) (born 1985), American basketball player
- Aaron Bruce (born 1984), Australian basketball player
- Aaron Cel (born 1987), French-Polish basketball player
- Aaron Cook Jr. (born 1997), American basketball player
- Aaron Craft (born 1991), American basketball player
- Aaron Davis (born 1979), American basketball player
- Aaron Doornekamp (born 1985), Canadian basketball player
- Aaron Epps (born 1996), American basketball player
- Aaron Falzon (born 1996), Maltese basketball player
- Aaron Fuller (born 1989), American-Mexican basketball player
- Aaron Geramipoor (born 1992), British-Iranian basketball player
- Aaron Gordon (born 1995), American NBA basketball player
- Aaron Gray (born 1984), American NBA basketball player
- Aaron Harper (basketball) (born 1981), American basketball player
- Aaron Harrison (born 1994), American basketball player
- Aaron Henry (basketball) (born 1999), American basketball player
- Aaron Holiday (born 1996), American NBA basketball player
- Aaron Jackson (basketball) (born 1986), American basketball player
- Aaron James (basketball) (born 1952), American NBA basketball player
- Aaron Johnson (basketball) (born 1988), American basketball player
- Aaron Johnston (basketball), American woman's basketball coach
- Aaron Jones (basketball) (born 1993), American basketball player
- Aaron Lucas (born 1979), American basketball player
- Aaron McGhee (born 1979), American basketball player
- Aaron McKie (born 1972), American NBA basketball player and coach
- Aaron Miles (basketball) (born 1983), American NBA basketball player and coach
- Aaron Nesmith (born 1999), American NBA basketball player
- Aaron Nkrumah (born 2001), American basketball player
- Aaron Olson (born 1978), Canadian-New Zealand basketball player
- Aaron Owens (born 1974), American basketball player
- Aaron Roussell, American basketball coach
- Aaron Swinson (born 1971), American basketball player
- Aaron Trahair (born 1978), Australian basketball player
- Aaron Valdes (born 1993), American basketball player
- Aaron Westbrooks (born 1986), Irish basketball player
- Aaron Wheeler (born 1998), American basketball player in the Israeli Basketball Premier League
- Aaron White (basketball) (born 1992), American basketball player
- Aaron Wiggins (born 1999), American NBA basketball player
- Aaron Williams (basketball) (born 1971), American NBA basketball player
- Aaron Pervis Williams (born 1991), American basketball player

==== Boxing ====
- Aaron Alafa (born 1983), American boxer
- Aaron Brown (1883–1934), American boxer known professionally as Dixie Kid
- Aaron Davis (boxer) (born 1967), American boxer
- Aaron Garcia (boxer) (born 1982), American boxer
- Aaron Herrera (boxer) (born 1990), Mexican boxer
- Aaron Mitchell (boxer), American boxer
- Aaron Popoola (born 1942), Ghanaian boxer
- Aaron Prince (born 1986), Trinidad and Tobago boxer
- Aaron Pryor (1955–2016), American boxer, a former world boxing champion
- Aaron Torres (born 1978), American boxer
- Aaron Wade (1916–1985), American boxer
- Aaron Williams (boxer) (born 1986), American boxer

==== Cricket ====
- Aaron Ayre (born 1992), Australian cricketer
- Aaron Barnes (cricketer) (born 1971), New Zealand cricketer
- Aaron Beard (born 1997), English cricketer
- Aaron Bird (born 1983), Australian cricketer
- Aaron Bradley (born 1974), New Zealand cricketer
- Aaron Cawley (born 1999), Irish cricketer
- Aaron Daley (cricketer, born 1956), Jamaican cricketer
- Aaron Finch (born 1986), Australian cricketer
- Aaron Gale (born 1970), New Zealand cricketer
- Aaron Gillespie (cricketer) (born 1997), Irish cricketer
- Aaron Hamilton (born 1978/1979), Australian cricket coach
- Aaron Hardie (born 1999), Australian cricketer
- Aaron Heal (born 1983), Australian cricketer
- Aaron Heywood, Irish cricketer
- Aaron Jeavons (born 1989), English cricketer
- Aaron Jones (cricketer) (born 1994), Barbadian cricketer
- Aaron Laraman (born 1979), English cricketer
- Aaron Nye (born 1978), Australian cricketer
- Aaron O'Brien (born 1981), Australian cricketer
- Aaron Phangiso (born 1984), South African cricketer
- Aaron Redmond (born 1979), New Zealand cricketer
- Aaron Summers (cricketer) (born 1996), Australian cricketer
- Aaron Thomas (cricketer) (born 1985), English cricketer
- Aaron Thomason (born 1997), English cricketer
- Aaron Wright (cricketer) (born 1997), Irish cricketer

==== Football ====
- Aaron Adeoye (born 1993), American football player
- Aaron Bailey (American football) (born 1971), American football player
- Aaron Banks (American football) (born 1997), American football player
- Aaron Beasley (born 1973), American football player
- Aaron Berry (born 1988), American football player
- Aaron Best (American football) (born 1978), American football player and head coach
- Aaron Bohl (born 1994), American football player and coach
- Aaron Boone (American football) (born 1978), American football player
- Aaron Boupendza (1996–2025), Gabonese football player
- Aaron Brant (born 1984), American football player
- Aaron Brewer (long snapper) (born 1990), American football player
- Aaron Brewer (offensive lineman) (born 1997), American football player
- Aaron Brooks (American football) (born 1976), American football player
- Aaron Brown (defensive lineman) (1943–1997), American football player
- Aaron Brown (linebacker) (born 1956), American football player
- Aaron Brown (running back) (born 1985), American football player
- Aaron Burbridge (born 1993), American football player
- Aaron Colvin (born 1991), American football player
- Aaron Corp (born 1989), American football player and coach
- Aaron Cox (born 1965), American football player
- Aaron Craver (born 1965), American football player
- Aaron Crawford (born 1986), Canadian football player
- Aaron Crawford (born 1997), American football player
- Aaron Curry (born 1986), American football player and coach
- Aaron Dashiell, American football player
- Aaron Dobson (born 1991), American football player
- Aaron Donald (born 1991), American football player
- Aaron Donkor (born 1995), German football player
- Aaron Elling (born 1978), American football player
- Aaron Fairooz (born 1983), Canadian football player
- Aaron Fiacconi (born 1979), Canadian football player
- Aaron Fields (born 1976), American football player
- Aaron Flowers (born 2006), American football player
- Aaron Francisco (born 1983), American football player
- Aaron Fuller, American football player
- Aaron Garcia (born 1970), American football player
- Aaron Gibson (born 1977), American football player
- Aaron Glenn (born 1972), American football player and coach
- Aaron Graham (born 1973), American football player
- Aaron Grant (1908–1966), American football player
- Aaron Graves (born 2003), American football player
- Aaron Green (born 1992), American football player
- Aaron Grymes (born 1991), Canadian football player
- Aaron Halterman (born 1982), American football player
- Aaron Hargreaves (born 1986), Canadian football player
- Aaron Shawn Harper (born 1968), American football player
- Aaron Hayden (American football) (born 1973), American football player
- Aaron Hernandez (1989–2017), American football player
- Aaron Hester (born 1990), American football player
- Aaron Hosack (born 1981), American football player
- Aaron Hunt (gridiron football) (born 1980), American Canadian football player
- Aaron Jones (defensive end) (born 1966), American football player
- Aaron Jones (running back) (born 1994), American football player
- Aaron Kampman (born 1979), American football player
- Aaron Keen (born 1972), American football player and coach
- Aaron Kelly (Canadian football) (born 1986), Canadian football player
- Aaron Kelton (born 1974), American college football coach and administrator
- Aaron Koch (born 1978), American football player
- Aaron Kromer (born 1967), American football coach
- Aaron Kyle (born 1954), American football player
- Aaron Laing (born 1971), American football player
- Aaron Lavarias (born 1988), Canadian football player
- Aaron Lesué (born 1982), American football player
- Aaron Lockett (gridiron football) (born 1978), American football player
- Aaron Lynch (American football) (born 1993), American football player
- Aaron Martin (American football) (born 1941), American football player
- Aaron Maybin (born 1988), American football player
- Aaron McConnell (born 1980), American football player
- Aaron McCreary (1892–1900s), American football, basketball, and baseball player and coach
- Aaron Mellette (born 1989), American football player
- Aaron Merz (born 1983), American football player
- Aaron Mills (born 1972), American football kicker
- Aaron Milton (born 1992), Canadian football player
- Aaron Mitchell (American football) (born 1956), American football player
- Aaron Monteiro (born 1997), American football player
- Aaron Moog (born 1962), American football player
- Aaron Moorehead (born 1980), American football player
- Aaron Morgan (born 1988), American football player
- Aaron Murray (born 1990), American football player
- Aaron Neary (born 1992), American football player
- Aaron Oliker (1903–1965), American football player
- Aaron Parker (American football), American football player
- Aaron Patrick (born 1996), American football player
- Aaron Pearson (born 1964), American football player
- Aaron Peck (American football) (born 1994), American football player
- Aaron Pelch (born 1977), American college athletics administrator and football coach
- Aaron Pettrey (born 1986), American football kicker
- Aaron Philo, American football player
- Aaron Pierce (American football) (born 1969), American football player
- Aaron Ripkowski (born 1992), American football player
- Aaron Robbins (born 1983), American football player
- Aaron Robinson (American football) (born 1998), American football player
- Aaron Roderick (born 1972), American football player and coach
- Aaron Rodgers (born 1983), American football player
- Aaron Rosenberg (1912–1979), American football player, and film and television producer
- Aaron Ross (born 1982), American football player
- Aaron Rouse (born 1984), American football player
- Aaron Schobel (born 1977), American football player
- Aaron Shampklin (born 1999), American football player
- Aaron Shea (born 1976), American football player
- Aaron Smith (American football) (born 1976), American football player
- Aaron Sparrow (born 1972), American football player
- Aaron Stecker (born 1975), American football player
- Aaron Stinnie (born 1994), American football player
- Aaron Taylor (American football, born 1972), American football player
- Aaron Taylor (American football, born 1975), American football player
- Aaron Thomas (American football) (born 1937), American football player
- Aaron Turner (American football) (born 1971), American football player
- Aaron Wagner (born 1982), Canadian football player
- Aaron Walker (American football) (born 1980), American football player
- Aaron Wallace (born 1967), American football player
- Aaron Wallace Jr. (born 1993), American football player
- Aaron Williams (American football) (born 1990), American football player
- Aaron Wilmer (born 1992), American football player
- Aaron Woods (gridiron football) (born 1986), American football player and coach

==== Golf ====
- Aaron Baddeley (born 1981), Australian golfer
- Aaron Goldberg (golfer) (born 1985), American golfer
- Aaron Leitmannstetter (born 1993), German golfer
- Aaron Rai (born 1995), English golfer
- Aaron Townsend (born 1981), Australian golfer
- Aaron Watkins (golfer) (born 1982), American golfer
- Aaron Wise (golfer) (born 1996), American golfer

==== Hockey ====
- Aaron Boh (born 1974), Canadian ice hockey player
- Aaron Boogaard (born 1986), Canadian ice hockey player
- Aaron Brand (born 1975), Canadian ice hockey player
- Aaron Brocklehurst (born 1985), Canadian ice hockey player
- Aaron Broten (born 1960), American ice hockey player
- Aaron Dell (born 1989), Canadian ice hockey goaltender
- Aaron Downey (born 1974), Canadian ice hockey player
- Aaron Ekblad (born 1996), Canadian ice hockey player
- Aaron Fox (ice hockey) (born 1976), American ice hockey player and executive
- Aaron Gagnon (born 1986), Canadian ice hockey player
- Aaron Gavey (born 1974), Canadian ice hockey player
- Aaron Hopkins (born 1979), Australian field hockey player
- Aaron Johnson (ice hockey) (born 1983), Canadian ice hockey player
- Aaron Keller (born 1975), Canadian-Japanese ice hockey player
- Aaron Kershaw (born 1992), Australian field hockey player
- Aaron Kleinschmidt (born 1989), Australian field hockey player
- Aaron MacKenzie (born 1981), Canadian ice hockey player
- Aaron Miller (ice hockey) (born 1971), American ice hockey player
- Aaron Ness (born 1990), American ice hockey player
- Aaron Palushaj (born 1989), American ice hockey player
- Aaron Rome (born 1983), Canadian ice hockey player and coach
- Aaron Schneekloth (born 1978), Canadian ice hockey player and coach
- Aaron Sorochan (born 1984), Canadian ice hockey goaltender
- Aaron Volpatti (born 1985), Canadian ice hockey player
- Aaron Voros (born 1981), Canadian ice hockey player
- Aaron Ward (ice hockey) (born 1973), Canadian ice hockey player

==== Mixed martial arts ====
- Aaron Banks (martial artist) (1928–2013), American mixed martial artist
- Aaron Brink (born 1974), American mixed martial artist and pornographic actor
- Aaron Chalmers (television personality) (born 1987), English mixed martial artist and reality television personality
- Aaron Phillips (fighter) (born 1989), American mixed martial artist
- Aaron Pico (born 1996), American mixed martial artist
- Aaron Riley (born 1980), American mixed martial artist
- Aaron Rosa (born 1983), American mixed martial artist
- Aaron Simpson (fighter) (born 1974), American mixed martial artist

==== Motorsports and racing ====
- Aaron Burkart (born 1982), German rally driver
- Aaron Cameron (born 2000), Australian racing driver
- Aaron Caratti (born 1980), Australian racing driver
- Aaron Fike (born 1982), American racing driver
- Aaron Gate (born 1990), New Zealand racing cyclist
- Aaron Gryder (born 1970), American horse racing jockey
- Aaron Gwin (born 1987), American downhill mountain biker
- Aaron Johnston (born 1995), Irish rally co-driver
- Aaron Justus (born 1973), American racing driver
- Aaron Keith (born 1971), American para-cyclist
- Aaron Kemps (born 1983), Australian racing cyclist
- Aaron Mason, British racing driver
- Aaron Olsen (born 1978), American road bicycle racer
- Aaron Plessinger (born 1996), American motocross rider
- Aaron Quine (born 1972), American racing driver
- Aaron Schooler (born 1985), Canadian cyclo-cross cyclist
- Aaron Seton (born 1998), Australian racing driver
- Aaron Slight (born 1966), New Zealand motorcycle racer
- Aaron Summers (speedway rider) (born 1988), Australian speedway rider
- Aaron Telitz (born 1991), American racing driver
- Aaron Trent (born 1986), American Paralympic cyclist
- Aaron Van Poucke (born 1998), Belgian cyclist
- Aaron Verwilst (born 1997), Belgian cyclist
- Aaron Williamson (born 1992), British racing driver
- Aaron Yates (motorcyclist) (born 1973), American motorcycle racer

==== Rugby ====
- Aaron Abrams (rugby union) (born 1979), Canadian rugby player
- Aaron Bancroft (rugby union) (born 1985), New Zealand rugby player
- Aaron Booth (rugby league) (born 1995), Australian rugby player
- Aaron Bramwell (born 1986), Welsh rugby player
- Aaron Brown (rugby league) (born 1992), British rugby player
- Aaron Cannings (born 1981), New Zealand rugby player
- Aaron Carpenter (rugby union) (born 1983), Canadian rugby player
- Aaron Carroll (rugby union) (born 1993), New Zealand rugby player
- Aaron Collins (rugby union) (born 1971), New Zealand rugby player
- Aaron Conneely (born 1992), Irish rugby player
- Aaron Coundley (born 1989), Welsh rugby player
- Aaron Cruden (born 1989), New Zealand rugby player
- Aaron Dundon (born 1982), New Zealand rugby player
- Aaron Findlay, Russian rugby player
- Aaron Gorrell (born 1981), Australian rugby player
- Aaron Grainger (born 1978), Australian rugby player
- Aaron Gray (rugby league) (born 1994), Australian rugby player
- Aaron Groom (born 1987), Fijian rugby player
- Aaron Heremaia (born 1982), New Zealand rugby player
- Aaron Hinkley (born 1999), English rugby player
- Aaron Hopa (1971–1998), New Zealand rugby player
- Aaron Jarvis (rugby union) (born 1986), Welsh rugby player
- Aaron Ketchell (born 1977), Australian rugby player
- Aaron Lester (born 1973), New Zealand rugby player
- Aaron Liffchak (born 1985), English rugby player
- Aaron Mauger (born 1980), New Zealand rugby player and coach
- Aaron McCloskey (born 1988), Irish rugby player
- Aaron Morgan (rugby league) (born 1978), Australian rugby player
- Aaron Morris (rugby union) (born 1995), English rugby player
- Aaron Moule (born 1977), Australian rugby player
- Aaron Murphy (born 1988), English rugby player
- Aaron O'Sullivan (born 1999), Irish rugby player
- Aaron Ollett (born 1992), English rugby player
- Aaron Payne (born 1982), Australian rugby player and coach
- Aaron Persico (born 1978), Italian rugby player
- Aaron Phipps (born 1983), British wheelchair rugby player
- Aaron Raper (born 1971), Australian rugby player
- Aaron Schoupp (born 2001), Australian rugby player
- Aaron Sexton (born 2000), Irish rugby player
- Aaron Shingler (born 1987), English rugby player
- Aaron Smith (rugby league, born 1982), British rugby player
- Aaron Smith (rugby union) (born 1988), New Zealand rugby player
- Aaron Smith (born 1996), British rugby player
- Aaron Summers (rugby league) (born 1981), Australian rugby player
- Aaron Teroi (born 1995), Australian rugby player
- Aaron Wainwright (born 1997), Welsh rugby player
- Aaron Wheatley (born 1981), Australian rugby player
- Aaron Whitchurch (born 1992), Australian rugby player
- Aaron Whittaker (born 1968), New Zealand rugby player
- Aaron Woods (born 1991), Australian rugby player

==== Football/soccer ====
- Aaron Amadi-Holloway (born 1993), Welsh footballer
- Aaron Anderson (soccer) (born 2000), Australian soccer player
- Aaron Appindangoyé (born 1992), Gabonese footballer
- Aaron Astudillo (born 2000), Venezuelan-Chilean footballer
- Aaron Barnes (footballer) (born 1996), English footballer
- Aaron Barry (born 1992), Irish footballer
- Aaron Bastiaans (born 2002), Dutch footballer
- Aaron Benjamin (born 1979), Canadian soccer player
- Aaron Bentley (born 1995), English footballer
- Aaron Berzel (born 1992), German footballer
- Aaron Black (born 1983), Irish footballer
- Aaron Black (footballer, born 1990), Australian football player
- Aaron Black (footballer, born 1992), Australian football player
- Aaron Boupendza (1996–2025), Gabonese footballer
- Aaron Brown (footballer, born 1980), English footballer
- Aaron Brown (footballer, born 1983), English footballer
- Aaron Callaghan (footballer, born 1966), Irish footballer and manager
- Aaron Calver (born 1996), Australian footballer
- Aaron Cervantes (born 2002), American soccer goalkeeper
- Aaron Chalmers (footballer) (born 1991), English footballer
- Aaron Chapman (born 1990), English football goalkeeper
- Aaron Clapham (born 1987), New Zealand footballer and coach
- Aaron Collins (footballer) (born 1997), Welsh footballer
- Aaron Comrie (born 1997), Scottish footballer
- Aaron Connolly (Scottish footballer) (born 1991)
- Aaron Connolly (Irish footballer) (born 2000)
- Aaron Conway (born 1985), Scottish footballer
- Aaron Cook (footballer) (born 1979), Welsh footballer
- Aaron Cornelius (born 1990), Australian rules footballer
- Aaron Cosgrave (born 1999), English footballer
- Aaron Cresswell (born 1989), English footballer
- Aaron Dankwah (born 1993), Ghanaian footballer
- Aaron Davey (born 1983), Australian rules football player
- Aaron Dawson (born 1992), English footballer
- Aaron Dennis (born 1993), American soccer player
- Aaron Dhondt (born 1995), Belgian footballer
- Aaron Doran (born 1991), Irish footballer
- Aaron Downes (born 1985), Australian footballer and manager
- Aaron Drewe (born 2001), English footballer
- Aaron Drinan (born 1998), Irish footballer
- Aaron Edwards (football) (born 1979), Gibraltarian football manager and team co-owner
- Aaron Edwards (born 1984), Australian rules footballer
- Aaron Essel (born 2005), Ghanaian footballer
- Aaron Evans (footballer) (born 1994), Australian footballer
- Aaron Evans-Harriott (born 2002), English footballer
- Aaron Fiora (born 1981), Australian rules footballer
- Aaron Flahavan (1975–2001), English football goalkeeper
- Aaron Flood, Gaelic footballer
- Aaron Francis (born 1997), Australian rules footballer
- Aaron Goulding (born 1982), Australian footballer
- Aaron Greaves (born 1977), Australian rules footballer and coach
- Aaron Grundy (born 1988), English footballer
- Aaron Hall (footballer) (born 1990), Australian rules footballer
- Aaron Hamill (born 1977), Australian rules footballer
- Aaron Hardy (born 1986), English footballer
- Aaron Hayden (footballer) (born 1997), English footballer
- Aaron Heap (born 2000), English footballer
- Aaron Heinzen (born 1979), American soccer player
- Aaron Henneman (born 1980), Australian rules footballer
- Aaron Henry (footballer) (born 2003), English footballer
- Aaron Herrera (soccer) (born 1997), American soccer player
- Aaron Herzog (born 1998), German footballer
- Aaron Hickey (born 2002), Scottish footballer
- Aaron Hoey, Irish Gaelic footballer
- Aaron Hohlbein (born 1985), American soccer player
- Aaron Horton (born 1992), American soccer player
- Aaron Hughes (born 1979), Northern Irish footballer
- Aaron Hulme (1886–1933), English footballer
- Aaron Hunt (born 1986), German footballer
- Aaron Ibilola (born 1997), Beninese footballer
- Aaron Leya Iseka (born 1997), Belgian footballer
- Aaron James (Australian footballer) (born 1976), Australian rules footballer
- Aaron Jarvis (footballer) (born 1998), English footballer
- Aaron Jones (footballer, born 1881) (1881–1954), English footballer
- Aaron Jones (footballer, born 1994), English footballer
- Aaron Joseph (born 1989), Australian rules footballer
- Aaron Katebe (born 1992), Zambian footballer
- Aaron Keating (born 1974), Australian rules footballer
- Aaron Kernan, Northern Irish Gaelic footballer
- Aaron King (born 1984), American soccer player
- Aaron Kovar (born 1993), American soccer player
- Aaron Kuhl (born 1996), English footballer
- Aaron Labonte (born 1983), English footballer
- Aaron Lawrence (born 1970), Jamaican footballer
- Aaron Ledgister (born 1988), English footballer
- Aaron Lennon (born 1987), English footballer
- Aaron Lennox (born 1993), Australian footballer
- Aaron Lescott (born 1978), English footballer
- Aaron Leventhal (born 1974), American soccer player
- Aaron Lewis (footballer) (born 1998), Welsh footballer
- Aaron Lockett (1892–1965), English footballer and cricketer
- Aaron Long (soccer) (born 1992), American soccer player
- Aaron López (footballer) (born 1983), Mexican footballer
- Aaron Lord (born 1975), Australian rules footballer
- Aaron Martin (footballer, born 1989), English footballer
- Aaron Martin (footballer, born 1991), English footballer
- Aaron Maund (born 1990), American soccer player
- Aaron McCarey (born 1992), Irish football goalkeeper
- Aaron McEneff (born 1995), Irish footballer
- Aaron McFarland (born 1972), New Zealand footballer and coach
- Aaron McGowan (born 1997), English footballer
- Aaron McLean (born 1983), English footballer
- Aaron Meijers (born 1987), Dutch footballer
- Aaron Millbank (born 1995), English footballer
- Aaron Mokoena (born 1980), South African footballer
- Aaron Molinas (born 2000), Argentine footballer
- Aaron Molloy (born 1997), Irish footballer
- Aaron Mooy (born 1990), Australian footballer
- Aaron Morley (born 2000), English footballer
- Aaron Morris (footballer) (born 1989), Welsh footballer
- Aaron Moses-Garvey (born 1989), English footballer
- Aaron Muirhead (born 1990), Scottish footballer
- Aaron Mullett (born 1992), Australian rules footballer
- Aaron Naughton (born 1999), Australian rules footballer
- Aaron Nemane (born 1997), French-English footballer
- Aaron Nguimbat (born 1978), Cameroonian footballer
- Aaron O'Connor (born 1983), English footballer
- Aaron O'Driscoll (born 1999), Irish footballer
- Aaron Samuel Olanare (born 1994), Nigerian footballer
- Aaron Opoku (born 1999), German footballer
- Aaron Parker (soccer) (born 1986), American soccer player
- Aaron Patton (born 1979), English footballer
- Aaron Payas (born 1985), Gibraltarian footballer
- Aaron Paye (born 1981), American-Liberian footballer
- Aaron Perez (born 1986), American soccer player
- Aaron Phillips (footballer) (born 1993), English footballer
- Aaron Pierre (born 1993), English footballer
- Aaron Pitchkolan (born 1983), American soccer player
- Aaron Pressley (born 2001), Scottish footballer
- Aaron Ramsey (footballer, born 2003), English footballer
- Aaron Ramsdale (born 1998), English footballer
- Aaron Ramsey (born 1990), Welsh footballer
- Aaron Reardon (soccer) (born 1999), Australian footballer
- Aaron Rogers (born 1984), Australian rules footballer
- Aaron Rowe (born 2000), English footballer
- Aaron Sandilands (born 1982), Australian rules footballer
- Aaron Schoenfeld (born 1990), American-Israeli soccer player
- Aaron Scott (footballer) (born 1986), New Zealand footballer
- Aaron Seydel (born 1996), German footballer
- Aaron Shattock (born 1980), Australian rules footballer
- Aaron Simpson (footballer, born 1997), English footballer
- Aaron Simpson (footballer, born 1999), English footballer
- Aaron Skelton (born 1974), British footballer
- Aaron Splaine (born 1996), Scottish footballer
- Aaron Steele (footballer, born 1983), English footballer
- Aaron Steele (footballer, born 1987), English footballer
- Aaron Tabacchi (born 1998), Italian footballer
- Aaron Taylor (footballer) (born 1990), English footballer
- Aaron Taylor-Sinclair (born 1991), Scottish footballer
- Aaron Travis (footballer) (1890–1966), English footballer
- Aaron Tredway (born 1976), American soccer player, author, inspirational speaker, and coach
- Aaron Tshibola (born 1995), English footballer
- Aaron Tumwa (born 1993), Antiguan footballer
- Aaron Walker (soccer) (born 1990), American soccer player
- Aaron Wan-Bissaka (born 1997), English footballer
- Aaron Webster (footballer) (born 1980), English footballer
- Aaron Westervelt (born 1979), Australian footballer
- Aaron Wheeler (soccer) (born 1988), American soccer player
- Aaron Wilbraham (born 1979), English footballer
- Aaron Wildig (born 1992), English footballer
- Aaron Williams (footballer) (born 1993), English footballer
- Aaron Xuereb (born 1979), Maltese footballer
- Aaron Young (footballer) (born 1992), Australian rules footballer

==== Swimming ====
- Aaron Bidois, New Zealand paralympic swimmer
- Aaron Moores (born 1994), British paralympic swimmer
- Aaron Peirsol (born 1983), American swimmer
- Aaron Rhind (born 1991), Australian swimmer

==== Track and field ====
- Aaron Armstrong (born 1977), Trinidad and Tobagian track and field sprinter
- Aaron Barclay (born 1992), New Zealand triathlete
- Aaron Booth (born 1996), New Zealand decathlete
- Aaron Brown (sprinter) (born 1992), Canadian sprinter
- Aaron Chatman (born 1987), Australian paralympic athlete
- Aaron Cleare (born 1983), Bahamian sprinter
- Aaron Costello (born 1993), Irish hurler
- Aaron Craig (born 1992), Irish hurler
- Aaron Cunningham (hurler) (born 1993), Irish hurler
- Aaron Dunphy (born 1998), Irish hurler
- Aaron Dupnai (born 1968), Papua New Guinean long-distance runner
- Aaron Egbele (born 1979), Nigerian sprinter
- Aaron Ernest (born 1993), American sprinter
- Aaron Gillane (born 1996), Irish hurler
- Aaron Mallett (born 1994), American hurdler
- Aaron Myers (born 1997), Irish hurler
- Aaron Neighbour (born 1977), Australian discus thrower and shot putter
- Aaron Payne (athlete) (born 1971), American sprinter
- Aaron Pike (athlete) (born 1985/1986), American athlete
- Aaron Ramirez (born 1964), American long-distance runner
- Aaron Royle (born 1990), Australian triathlete
- Aaron Scheidies (born 1982), American Paralympic triathlete
- Aaron Sheehan (hurler) (born 1994), Irish hurler

==== Wrestling ====
- Aaron Aguilera (born 1977), American wrestler and actor
- Aaron Brooks (wrestler) (born 2000), American wrestler
- Aaron Idol (born 1980), Canadian wrestler
- Aaron Stevens (born 1982), American wrestler

==== Other sports ====
- Aaron Addison (born 1995), Australian tennis player
- Aaron Alexandre (1765/68–1850), German-French-English chess player
- Aaron Blunck (born 1996), American freestyle skier
- Aaron Bold (born 1985), Canadian lacrosse player
- Aaron Canavan (born 1975), Jersey snooker player
- Aaron Chia (born 1997), Malaysian badminton player
- Aaron Codina (born 1999), Chilean handball player
- Aaron Cohen (judoka), American judoka
- Aaron Cook (taekwondo) (born 1991), British-Moldovan taekwondo athlete
- Aaron Cross (born 1975), American quadriplegic archer
- Aaron Ewen (born 1996/1997), New Zealand paralympic alpine skier
- Aaron Feinberg (born 1981), American inline skater
- Aaron Feinstein (fl. 1903–1910), Estonian chess player
- Aaron Feltham (water polo) (born 1982), Canadian water polo player
- Aaron Fenton (born 1982), American lacrosse goaltender
- Aaron Fernandes (born 1956), Canadian field hockey player
- Aaron Fotheringham (born 1991), American wheelchair athlete
- Aaron Frankcomb (born 1985), Australian squash player
- Aaron Fukuhara (born 1991), American judoka
- Aaron Goodwin, American sports agent
- Aaron Hadlow (born 1988), British kiteboarder
- Aaron Herman (born 1953), American rower
- Aaron Hill (snooker player) (born 2002), Irish snooker player
- Aaron Kanter, American poker player
- Aaron Kostner (born 1999), Italian Nordic combined skier
- Aaron Krickstein (born 1967), American tennis player
- Aaron Lindström (born 2000), Swedish male paralympic alpine skier
- Aaron Links (born 1981), American bodybuilder
- Aaron Lowe (born 1974), Canadian ice dancer
- Aaron Maddron (born 1970), American bodybuilder
- Aaron March (born 1986), Italian alpine snowboarder
- Aaron McKibbin (born 1991), English paralympic table tennis player
- Aaron McIntosh (born 1972), New Zealand windsurfer
- Aaron Mensing (born 1997), Danish-German handball player
- Aaron Muss (born 1994), American snowboarder
- Aaron Parchem (born 1977), American figure skater
- Aaron Pollock (born 1967), American rower
- Aaron Pope (born 1999), Scottish track cyclist
- Aaron Russell (born 1993), American volleyball player
- Aaron Sluchinski (born 1987), Canadian curler
- Aaron Squires (born 1992), Canadian curler
- Aaron Summerscale (born 1969), English chess player
- Aaron Tennant (born 1991), Irish lawn bowler
- Aaron Teys (born 1993), Australian lawn and indoor bowler
- Aaron Tran (born 1996), American short track speed skater
- Aaron Van Cleave (born 1987), German pair skater
- Aaron Wilson (lacrosse) (born 1980), Canadian lacrosse player
- Aaron Wilson (bowls) (born 1991), Australian lawn bowler
- Aaron Wolf (judoka) (born 1996), Japanese judoka
- Aaron Younger (born 1991), Australian water polo player
- Aaron Zang (born 1982), Chinese poker player

=== Academia ===
- Aaron Ben-Ze'ev (born 1949), Israeli philosopher and President of the University of Haifa
- Aaron Twerski (born 1939), American lawyer and law professor

=== Crime ===
- Aaron Danielson (died 2020), American far-right activist charged with homicide who was shot dead
- Aaron Gunches (1971–2025), American prisoner
- Aaron M. Kohn (1910-1989), crime investigator and FBI agent

== Fictional characters ==
- Aaron (The Walking Dead), fictional character from The Walking Dead
- Aaron Hotchner, one of the main protagonists in Criminal Minds
- Aaron the moor, fictional character in Titus Andronicus by Shakespeare
- Aaron (Beyblade), fictional character in Beyblade
- Aaron, in the DreamWorks animated film The Prince of Egypt
- Aaron Brennan, in the Australian soap opera Neighbours
- Aaron Clocker, racer in Cars 3
- Aaron Dinkins, a character in the Barbie movie
- Aaron Davis, known as the Prowler and Miles Morales' uncle in Spider-Verse
- Aaron Dingle, fictional character in British soap Emmerdale
- Aaron Fox (Nexo Knights), a character in Nexo Knights
- Aaron Jackson, a character in Grown-ish
- Aaron Jacobs, recurring character in the drama HBO series Euphoria
- Aaron Mitchell, main character in the animated film The Mitchells vs the Machines
- Aaron Rose, recurring character in the television series Gossip Girl
- Aaron Samuels, in Mean Girls
- Aaron Stone, title character in the Disney XD series of the same name
- Aaron T. and Z, both characters from the 2022 Pixar film Turning Red
- Aaron Warner, main character in the YA novel series Shatter Me
- Aaron Whitman, a character in The Vampire Diaries
- Sir Aaron, a character in the film Pokémon: Lucario and the Mystery of Mew
- Aaron, a minor enemy in the indie game Undertale

== See also ==
- Arron, given name and surname
- Aron (name)
- Erin, given name

== Sources ==
- А. В. Суперанская (A. V. Superanskaya). "Современный словарь личных имён: Сравнение. Происхождение. Написание" (Modern Dictionary of First Names: Comparison. Origins. Spelling). Айрис-пресс. Москва, 2005. ISBN 5-8112-1399-9
- Н. А. Петровский (N. A. Petrovsky). "Словарь русских личных имён" (Dictionary of Russian First Names). ООО Издательство "АСТ". Москва, 2005. ISBN 5-17-002940-3
