= アーロン =

アーロン may refer to:

- Aaron (given name)
- Auron (Final Fantasy), a character in the video game Final Fantasy X
- Arlong, a character in the manga series One Piece
