= Aaron Fish =

Aaron Fish may refer to:

- Aaron Fish (producer) (born 1962), entertainment producer, promoter and brand creator
- Aaron Fish (businessman) (born 1930s), Canadian key and lock distributor
