= Aaron Hazzan =

Abraham Aaron Bacharach was a writer on religious subjects, and cantor of Posen, hence known also as Aaron Ḥazzan. He flourished during the seventeenth century. He was the author of Urim we-Tummim (Enlightenment and Perfection), an exhortation to morality and piety, with an appendix containing prayers (Amsterdam, 1653).

== Bibliography ==
- Moritz Steinschneider, Cat. Bodl. col. 702;
- Julius Fürst, Bibl. Jud. p. 75;
- Zedner, Cat. Hebr. Books Brit. Mus. p. 29;
- Benjacob, Oẓar ha-Sefarim, p. 30.L. G. I.
