= Aarón =

Aarón is the Spanish form of the Biblical name Aharon.

Notable people who are often referred to solely by this name include:

- Puerto Rican Pentecostal sect leader Teófilo Vargas Seín, who uses Aarón as his religious title
- Aarón Ñíguez (born 1989), Spanish professional footballer
- Aarón (footballer) (born 1982), German-Spanish footballer

Other notable people with the given name of Aarón include:

- Aarón Bueno Gómez (born 1983), Spanish footballer who plays for Gimnàstic de Tarragona

== See also ==
- Aaron (surname)
