= Aaron Solomon =

Jewish merchant

Aaron Solomon was a Jewish merchant of Philadelphia, who, about 1777, signed an agreement to take the colonial paper currency sanctioned by King George III in place of gold and silver. He left Philadelphia for Europe in 1785.
