= Aaron Lucius Chapin =

American minister

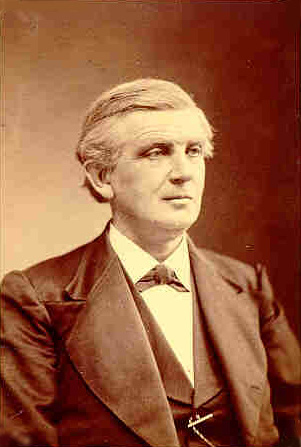
- Aaron Lucius Chapin
- Born: February 6, 1817; Hartford, Connecticut, U.S.
- Died: July 22, 1892 (aged 75); Beloit, Wisconsin, U.S.
- Education: Yale College (B.A., 1837); Union Theological Seminary (1839–1842)
- Occupations: Minister, Educator, College President
- Known for: First president of Beloit College (1850–1886)
- Notable work: Textbooks on political economy
- Honors: Doctor of Divinity – Williams College (1853); LL.D. – University of the State of New York (1882)

Aaron Lucius Chapin (February 6, 1817 – July 22, 1892) was an American minister and the first president of Beloit College.

Chapin, the second son and third child of Deacon Laertes and Laura (Colton) Chapin, of Hartford, Connecticut, was born there on February 6, 1817. He graduated from Yale College in 1837. During the year after graduation he taught in a family school in Baltimore, Maryland, and from 1838 to 1843 he was a professor in the New York Institution for the Deaf and Dumb in New York City, in the meantime also completing (1839–42) the course in the Union Theological Seminary.

On January 24, 1844, he was ordained at Milwaukee, in Wisconsin Territory, where for nearly six years he served as pastor of the First Presbyterian Church with signal success. In December, 1849, he was called to Beloit, Wisconsin, to fill the presidency of the College just established there, and that position he occupied from February, 1850, until his resignation in July, 1886. He retained a chair of instruction in Civil Polity until his death, although prostrated by paralysis in 1888. The degree of Doctor of Divinity was conferred on him by Williams College in 1853, and that of Doctor of Laws by the Regents of the University of the State of New York in 1882. At Beloit he also served as a teacher, especially of political economy, and published one or two text-books in that science.

He married on August 23, 1843, Martha, daughter of Rodolphus Colton, of Lenox, Mass., who died on December 12, 1859. He next married, on August 26, 1861, Fanny L, eldest daughter of Robert Coit, of New London, Conn., who survived him. By his first marriage he had two sons who died in infancy, and a daughter who became a missionary in China, and survived him. His children by his second marriage were a son and three daughters, all of whom survived him except one daughter who died in infancy.

He died in Beloit on July 22, 1892, aged 75.

This article incorporates public domain material from the 1893 Yale Obituary Record.
