= Aaron Simpson (footballer, born 1999) =

English footballer

Personal information
- Date of birth: 17 June 1999 (age 27)
- Place of birth: Croydon, England
- Height: 1.76 m (5 ft 9 in)
- Position: Midfielder

Team information
- Current team: Folkestone Invicta

Youth career
- Gillingham

Senior career*
Years	Team	Apps	(Gls)
2017–2019	Gillingham	0	(0)
2018	→ Margate (loan)		
2019–2020	Hythe Town	11	(0)
2020	Ramsgate	6	(0)
2020–	Folkestone Invicta	7	(0)
- * Club domestic league appearances and goals as of 19:03, 9 November 2020 (UTC)

Aaron Simpson (born 17 June 1999) is an English professional footballer who plays for Folkestone Invicta, as a midfielder.

== Early and personal life ==
Simpson was born in Croydon. Hailing from Rainham, Simpson was given a community award by the Medway African Caribbean Society in January 2018 for his work with schools in the area.

== Career ==
Simpson began his career with Gillingham, turning professional in the summer of 2017 and moving on loan to Margate in January 2018. He signed a new one-year contract in July 2018.

He was offered a new contract by Gillingham at the end of the 2018–19 season. After rejecting the contract offer, he joined Hythe Town in August 2019.

After 11 league appearances for Hythe, in early 2020 Simpson joined Ramsgate. After 6 league appearances, in September 2020 he then moved to Folkestone Invicta.
