= Aaron Wexler =

American artist

Aaron Wexler (born 1974) is an American artist based in New York City.

Wexler was born in Philadelphia. He makes layered acrylic and paper collages on surfaces of panel and paper. His work features a mixture of figurative and abstract imagery, and real and imagined spaces.

He received his MFA in painting and drawing from The School of The Art Institute of Chicago in 1999.

== Selected exhibitions ==
1999

- Post MFA, Peter Miller Gallery, Chicago

2000

- Minimal Provocations, Betty Rymer Gallery, Chicago,
- Flat Files, Bellwether Gallery, Brooklyn

2001

- FFWD Miami, Contemporary Art Fair, Miami
- The Willow House, Ukrainian Institute of Modern Art, Chicago

2002

- Gecenkondu, Apexart, New York

2003

- Team Work, Vox Populi Gallery, Philadelphia

2004

- Aaron Wexler & Colin Keefe, PS122 Gallery, New York

2005

- No Apology For Breathing, Jack The Pelican Presents, Brooklyn

2006

- The New Collage, Pavel Zoubok Gallery, New York
- 181st Annual Invitational Exhibition of Contemporary Art, The National Academy Museum, New York

2008

- One In The Other Gallery, London
- Josee Bienveunu Gallery, New York
