= Aaron Oliker =

American football player (1903–1965)

Profile
- Position: End

Personal information
- Born: December 5, 1903; Clarksburg, West Virginia, U.S.
- Died: September 8, 1965 (aged 61); Clarksburg, West Virginia, U.S.
- Listed height: 5 ft 11 in (1.80 m)
- Listed weight: 170 lb (77 kg)

Career information
- College: West Virginia

Career history
- Pottsville Maroons (1926)

Career statistics
- Games played: 1
- Stats at Pro Football Reference

Aaron Earl Oliker (December 5, 1903 – September 8, 1965) was an American football end.

Oliker played college football for the West Virginia Mountaineers from 1922 to 1925. During the 1924 and 1925 seasons, the Mountaineers compiled a 16–2 record with Oliker playing "practically every minute of every game". He began his career as a backup halfback before being converted into a starter at end. He also played baseball and completed in track for the West Virginia Mountaineers.

In 1926, Oliker played one game for the Pottsville Maroons of the National Football League (NFL).

Oliker later worked for many years with the Jefferson Standard Life Insurance Co. He died in September 1965 at age 62.
