= Aaron Fowler =

American artist

- Born: July 23, 1988 (age 37); St. Louis, Missouri
- Known for: Sculpture; drawing
- Awards: Jacob Lawrence Prize, Rema Host Mann Foundation Emerging Artist Grant

Aaron Fowler (born July 23, 1988, St. Louis, Missouri) is an American contemporary interdisciplinary artist who lives and works in Los Angeles. His work has been shown at the New Museum, Studio Museum in Harlem, Rubell Museum, Seattle Art Museum, Columbus College of Art and Design, and Hammer Museum. Much of his work deals with community involvement through his project Into Existence.

Fowler received his BFA from the Pennsylvania Academy of the Fine Arts and his MFA from Yale University School of Art. He also attended the Skowhegan School of Painting and Sculpture in 2014.
