= Aaron Commodore =

American politician

Member of the Virginia House of Delegates
- In office 1875–1877

Personal details
- Born: 1819 or 1820
- Died: June 24, 1892 (aged 72–73)
- Party: Republican
- Spouse: Catherine Williams

Aaron Commodore (born 1819 or 1820, died June 24, 1892) was an African-American businessman, politician, and formerly enslaved person. He served on the Virginia House of Delegates from 1875 to 1877.

== Early life ==
Not much is concretely known about Commodore's early life. He was born into slavery around 1819 and 1820, possibly in Essex County, Virginia. He took two wives. Commodore married his first wife, Lettie (or Letty), while still enslaved; she died at some unknown point in time. By 1870, he was recorded as being married to Catherine (or Katherine).

Commodore was described as a large man with a strong presence and was known for his leadership qualities. This reputation led him to be selected for jury duty when Chief Justice Salmon P. Chase called for respectable African-Americans to serve on the grand jury. Commodore was not selected per his request, as he was willing to serve on the jury but did not have anyone to monitor his business while the court was in session. He declined to accept money for his travel expenses, as travel to the courthouse had been slightly difficult for him, but eventually took the money after being pressed. This interaction impressed both Chase and the United States marshal involved in the event, and both men would later write about this interaction.

== Politics ==
In November 1875, Commodore was elected to the Virginia House of Delegates, representing Essex County. His opponent, Albert R. Micou, challenged the election, but this challenge was dismissed. Commodore did not serve on the House of Delegates after 1875 but did remain active in politics. On July 31, 1884, he had to defend himself in the Richmond Daily Whig newspaper when some local Democrats alleged that several armed African Americans had been seen at a polling location in Tappahannock during the 1883 elections, which gives off the impression that Commodore was potentially literate during this point in time.

Commodore died on June 24, 1892, likely in Tappahannock, Virginia.

In 2013, Commodore was one of several African Americans commemorated by the Commonwealth of Virginia for their service to the Virginia House of Delegates from 1869 to 1890.

== See also ==
- African American officeholders from the end of the Civil War until before 1900
