= Aaron Jernigan =

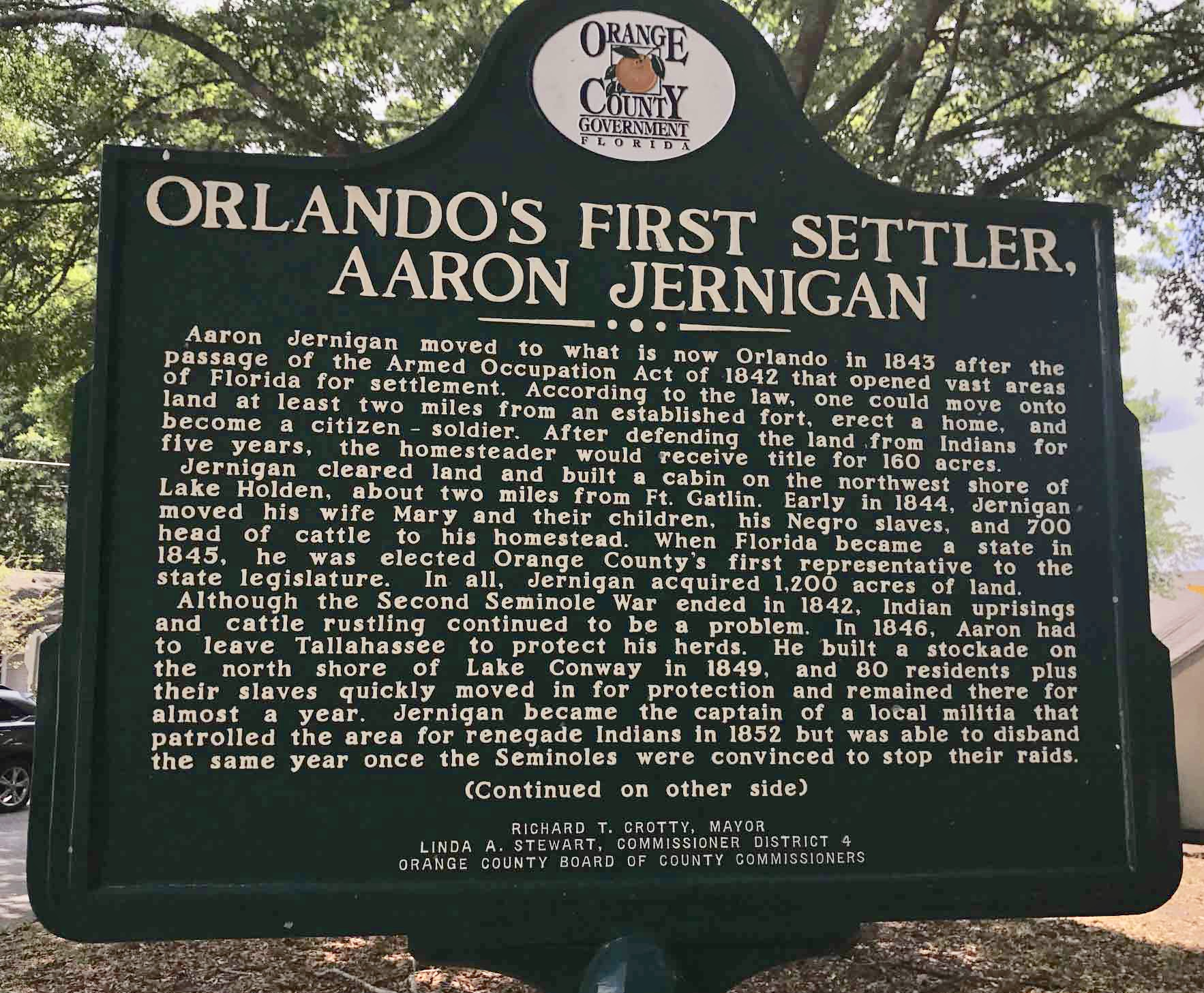
Historical Marker to Orlando's First Settler, Aaron Jernigan

Aaron David Jernigan (September 14, 1813 – August 25, 1891) was the first settler of what is now Orange County, Florida. Originally from Camden County, Georgia, he lived for a time in the Tallahassee area before moving to Orange County in 1843. He was influential in the city of Orlando's early development; the town was called Jernigan until 1857.

Jernigan and his wife, Mary, settled on the shore of Lake Holden, purchasing 1,200 acres (4.9 km^{2}) and moving some 700 head of cattle down from Tallahassee area where Jernigan and his brother Isaac (who also moved to Orlando) continued to own land and raise cattle. Jernigan cleared a spot near Lake Conway and built a small cabin, and began planting crops including corn, cotton, rice, sugar cane, pumpkins, and even melons. Jernigan was a successful tradesman and merchant. He was also a captain of the local militia that patrolled against native Seminoles. Jernigan's settlement quickly grew and he was elected a county representative in 1846. By 1850, according to state files, the Jernigan home had become the nucleus of a settlement and designated a post office.

He died in 1891, and was buried at Lake Hill Cemetery in Orlo Vista. A memorial plaque placed at his grave in 1971 honors him as "Orlando's first settler."
