= Aaron Albert Carr =

Aaron Albert Carr (born 1963) is a Laguna Pueblo/Navajo documentary film maker and author. His first novel, published in 1995, Eye Killers was described as "Dracula-meets-Geronimo," and combines elements of European vampire legend with Monster Slayer of Native American Myth.
