= Aaron Patton =

English footballer

Personal information
- Date of birth: 27 February 1979 (age 47)
- Place of birth: London, England
- Position: Defender

Senior career*
Years	Team	Apps	(Gls)
1996–1999	Wycombe Wanderers	1	(0)
1999–2000	Hayes	12	(0)
- * Club domestic league appearances and goals

Aaron Patton (born 6 February 1979) is an English former professional footballer who played in The Football League for Wycombe Wanderers.
