= Aaron Carotta =

American television host (born 1977)

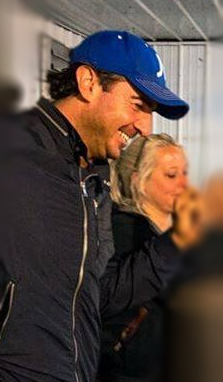
- Carotta in 2018
- Born: Aaron Michael Carotta; Louisiana, United States
- Occupation(s): News reporter and adventurer
- Years active: 2008–present
- Website: www.adventureaaron.com

Aaron Michael Carotta (born November 18, 1977) known as Adventure Aaron, is an American television personality, travel blogger, and former news reporter. Carotta has previously been a morning live reporter for WLUV TV6.

== Career ==
Carotta was born in Louisiana on 18 November 1977.

=== 2010–2015: Early television career ===
Carotta has been producing his own television shows since 2010.

=== 2018: WLUC TV6 ===
Throughout 2018, Carrota was a morning live reporter for WLUC TV 6. He left in August 2018.

== Bibliography ==
- Catch and Cook (2013)

== Filmography ==
- Alive! with Adventure Aaron (2010)
- Bucket Wish (2012)
- Catch and Cook with Adventure Aaron (2012–2014)
- Finding the Current (2018)
