= Aaron Abba ben Johanan ha-Levi =

Aaron Abba ben Johanan ha-levi (died 18 June 1643) was a prominent rabbi born around the close of the sixteenth century and died in Lemberg (currently Lviv, Ukraine). He was president of a rabbinical college in Lemberg. His decisions are found in the rabbinical responsa of Abraham Rapoport, Joel Särkes, and Meir Lublin; the last-named especially speaks very highly of him.
