= Aaron Russell (baseball) =

American baseball player

- Third baseman
- Born: April 2, 1879; Chattanooga, Tennessee, U.S.
- Died: September 29, 1949 (aged 70); Grove City, Pennsylvania, U.S.
- Batted: Right Threw: Right

Negro league baseball debut
- 1918, for the Homestead Grays

Last appearance
- 1918, for the Homestead Grays

Teams
- Homestead Grays (1918)

Aaron Alexander Russell (April 2, 1879 – September 29, 1949) was an American Negro league third baseman in the 1910s.

A native of Chattanooga, Tennessee, Russell played for the Homestead Grays in 1918. He died in Grove City, Pennsylvania in 1949 at age 70.
