= Aaron Dignan =

American businessman and writer

Aaron Dignan (born December 20, 1979) is an American businessman and writer.

== Career ==
Dignan is the founder of The Ready, an org design company based in New York City, New York; and the former CEO of Undercurrent.

He is the author of Game Frame: Using Games as a Strategy for Success (Free Press, 2011, ISBN 978-1451611052).

Dignan sits for digital-advisory boards for General Electric, American Express and PepsiCo, as well as the board of directors for Smashburger.
