= Aaron (monk) =

Coptic Orthodox saint

Saint
- Venerated in: Coptic Church
- Feast: October 19

Saint Aaron (also known as Saint Aaron of Philae) was an ancient Christian monk in Southern Egypt who lived during the fourth and early fifth centuries AD. He was an anchorite at Philae.

He is venerated as a saint in the Coptic Orthodox Church of Alexandria. He has an annual feast in that church on 22 Paopi (October 19 in the Gregorian calendar).

== Bibliography ==
- Holweck, F. G. A Biographical Dictionary of the Saints. St. Louis, MO: B. Herder Book Co. 1924.
- Van der Vliet, Jacques; Dijkstra, Jitse (2019). The Coptic Life of Aaron: Critical Edition, Translation and Commentary. Brill Publishers. ISBN 978-90-04-41301-6.
