= Aaron Parry =

American rabbi

Aaron Parry (died July 19, 2023) was an American synagogue rabbi, counter-missionary expert, and author of several beginners books on Judaism.

He was formerly the Rabbi of Young Israel of Beverly Hills. He was also the former education director for the West Coast branch of Jews for Judaism, and has been quoted as an expert on Jewish counter-missionary activity.

Parry held a Master's degree in Jewish Studies from New York State University. He taught at Shalhevet High School in Los Angeles. A few days each season, since 2000, he set up and managed a kosher food stand at Dodger Stadium.

Parry died at age 66 in 2023 of a heart attack.

== Bibliography ==
- The Complete Idiot's Guide to the Talmud (Alpha Books, 2004) - reviewed by The Jewish Journal
- The Complete Idiot's Guide to Hebrew Scripture (Alpha Books, 2004)
