= Aaron Bramwell =

- Born: 1 March 1986 (age 40) Aberdare, Rhondda Cynon Taf, Wales
- Height: 6 ft 1 in (1.85 m)
- Weight: 14.2 st (90 kg)

Rugby union career
- Position: Wing
Senior career
Years	Team	Apps	(Points)
	Pontypridd RFC	33	(14 Tries 18 Penalties 24 Conversions)
International career
Years	Team	Apps	(Points)
- Wales 7s

Aaron Bramwell (born 1 March 1986 in Aberdare, Rhondda Cynon Taf, Wales) is a rugby union player for Neath RFC in the Principality Premiership.

== Career ==
Bramwell has previously played for Dunvant RFC, Swansea RFC, Neath RFC and Ebbw Vale RFC. Bramwell is a current Wales Sevens player. Bramwell was elected Principality Player of the Month in October 2008. Bramwell also is one of 11 players to go on and be capped at all levels. Bramwell is currently selected for the Wales 7s team to the IRB 2010 Hong Kong 7s Tournament. His position of choice is at Outside Half. Bramwell is a versatile player in modern-day rugby football as he has gained experience in a number of positions on the playing field.
