= Aaron Davis (basketball) =

American basketball player

Free agent
- Position: Guard

Personal information
- Born: May 30, 1979 (age 47) Los Angeles, California
- Listed height: 6 ft 4 in (1.93 m)
- Listed weight: 205 lb (93 kg)

Career information
- High school: Buchholz (Gainesville, Florida)
- College: Faulkner State CC (1997–
- Playing career: 2001–2008

Career history
- 2001–2002: Azoty Unia Tarnów
- 2002–2003: Grand Rapids Hoops
- 2003: Brevard Blue Ducks
- 2004: Oklahoma Storm
- 2006: Imperial Hawks
- 2007–2008: J-Squad Patriots

Aaron Alexander Davis (born May 30, 1979) is an American basketball player. He played collegiately for Faulkner State Community College in 1997–98. and University of Florida (1999–2001)

== Professional career ==
In 2001, Davis participated in veterans' camp with the Miami Heat and was released before the regular season.

He played for Azoty Unia Tarnów in the Polish Basketball League in the 2001–02 season after being released by Miami.

After one season in Poland, Aaron was invited by the Sacramento Kings to join their NBA Summer League team in the L.A Summer Pro League in Long Beach, California in 2002. After the summer season he went on to join the Brevard Blue Ducks in 2003 and the Oklahoma Storm in 2004 of the United States Basketball League, where he averaged 11.6 points per game in both seasons combined and also had a brief stint with the Grand Rapids Hoops of the Continental Basketball Association.

Davis played professional basketball for the Japan Basketball League, first in 2006 with the Imperial Hawks then in 2007 and 2008 with the J-Squad Patriots.
