= Aaron Moses ben Mordecai =

Aaron Moses ben Mordecai was one of the few cabalistic writers of East Prussia: author of a work, "Nishmat Shelomoh Mordecai" (The Soul of Solomon Mordecai; Johannisberg, 1852), so called in remembrance of his son, who died in early childhood. On the title-page the statement is made that the work is a commentary on M. Ḥ. Luzzatto's "Ḥoḳer u-Meḳubbal"; indeed the text of this treatise is printed in the volume. Aaron used the name of Luzzatto merely to give greater vogue to his own book, because of the waning influence of the Cabala in Poland at the time. In reality, Aaron's work is a commentary on the "'Eẓ Ḥayyim" of Ḥayyim Vital, the arch-apostle of the cabalistic school of Luria. Aaron Moses states (l.c. p. 46a) that he was the author also of a commentary on the Midrash Tanḥuma, entitled "Zebed Ṭob" (A Goodly Gift). This has not been printed.
