= Aaron R. Hudson =

Aaron R. Hudson (died 1907) was an American soldier and recipient of the Medal of Honor.

== Biography ==
Born in Madison County, Kentucky, Hudson served as a private in Company C of the 17th Indiana Volunteer Mounted Infantry Regiment during the American Civil War. Hudson earned his medal in April 1865 at Culloden, Georgia for "Capture of flag of Worrill Grays (C.S.A.).". His medal was issued on June 17, 1865. Hudson is buried in Ragan Cemetery, Neosho, Missouri.
