= Aaron Elijah Pumpianski =

Russian rabbi & author (1835–1893)

- Born: 1835; Vilna, Vilna Governorate, Russian Empire
- Died: 26 April 1893 (aged 57–58); Riga, Livonia Governorate, Russian Empire
- Occupation: Crown rabbi
- Writing career
- Pen name: I. Heiman (И. Гейман)
- Language: Russian, Hebrew

Aaron Elijah ben Aryeh Löb Pumpianski (Hebrew: אַהֲרֹן אֵלִיָּהוּ בֵּן אַרְיֵה לֵיבּ פּוּמפִּיאַנְסקִי, romanized: Aharon Eliyahu ben Aryeh Leyb Pumpianski, Russian: Арон Илия Пумпянский, romanized: Aron Ilya Pumpyanskiy; 1835 – 26 April 1893) was a Russian crown rabbi and author.

Born in Vilna in 1835, he graduated from that city's rabbinical school in 1859 and edited, in conjunction with Asher Wohl, the Russian supplement to Ha-Karmel (1860–61). In 1861 Pumpianski was chosen crown rabbi of Ponevezh, Kovno Governorate, where he remained until 1873; he was then elected to the same office in the Jewish community of Riga, remaining there until his death.

Pumpianski was the author of a collection of sermons in Russian which he delivered in Ponevezh (Riga, 1870); a new edition of the Psalms with a Russian translation and a Hebrew commentary (Warsaw, 1871); Solomon Premudroi (Riga, 1882), a Russian drama which he published under the pseudonym "I. Heiman"; Shire-Tsiyyon, Hebrew poetry, of which the latter part contains translations from Russian poets. He also edited a monthly magazine, Yevreiskiya zapiski, of which twelve issues appeared in Riga in 1881. He wrote for that magazine and for various other Russian Jewish and Russian periodicals numerous articles on diverse topics, among them being a sketch of the history of the Jews in Courland and Livonia.

== Publications ==
- Sefer Tehillim (in Hebrew and Russian). Warsaw: Tipografii N. Shriftgissera. 1871.
- Solomon Premudroi (in Russian). Riga. 1882.
- Shire-Tsiyyon (in Hebrew). Vilna: Defus R. Yehuda Leib ben R. Eliezer Lipman. 1884.
- Mishlei (in Hebrew and Russian). Saint Petersburg: Defus Eliezer Behrman ve-Tzvi Rabinovitz. 1891.
