= Aaron Williams (ventriloquist) =

American ventriloquist

Aaron Williams is an American ventriloquist.

== Biography ==
=== Early life ===
Williams was born in Atlanta, Georgia, and came to live in Dayton, Ohio, at a young age. His mother died in 1941 and he went to live with his aunt, in Dayton's Hunk Town. In 5th grade, at Edison School, Williams was allowed to assist a magician who performed for the students. He was immediately fascinated. A teacher noticed he was good with his hands and showed him a Charlie McCarthy dummy doll.

After graduation in 1951, William worked at SWS Chevrolet parking cars and then was hired at Wright Patterson Air Force Base. In the meantime, Williams continued to refine the art of projecting his voice. A fellow worker told him about a dummy that was for sale and Williams scraped up enough money to purchase the head, constructed the body himself, integrated it with a can of brown paint, and thus was born "Freddie". After putting together a routine and perfecting his technique, they began to work the local club circuit.

Aaron Williams has a growing family that includes two daughters Mona Williams of Dayton, Ohio, Monique Townes & husband Bernie of Long Island, New York, and her twin sons Michael Wallace & wife Amanda of Bowie, Maryland, and Dean Wallace & wife Raequel of Silver Spring, Maryland and their daughter Sophia.

=== Career ===
His first break came when he was noticed by the publicist for The Smothers Brothers Show which led to him becoming a regular feature on their television show at CBS. On October 6, 1968, Williams appeared on a Smothers Brothers Show which featured an appearance by The Beatles. In February 1968, he guest starred on The Tonight Show Starring Johnny Carson with Harry Belafonte as guest host. Others that night were Martin Luther King Jr., Bobby Kennedy, Nipsey Russell, Paul Newman, and Lena Horne. On returning to Los Angeles, he appeared on the Pat Boone Show along with Richard Pryor.

Williams has performed with Sammy Davis Jr., Ray Charles, Jerry Lewis, Gladys Knight, Lawrence Welk, Aretha Franklin, Vicki Carr, Redd Foxx, Robert Goulet, The 5th Dimension, Dionne Warwick, B.B. King, Tina Turner, Buddy Hackett, Sister Sledge, Chubby Checker, Lou Rawls, Kenny Rogers, Harry Belafonte, Sidney Poitier, Melba Moore, Temptations, Richard Pryor. Williams has performed all around the world.

In 1967, Williams joined the Los Angeles County Sheriff's Department. He attained the rank of Sergeant and became a sought-after personality along with his deputy, Freddie. The team spread the anti-drug and anti-gang messages in person and on television throughout the schools in all of Los Angeles County.

Williams has most recently come out of retirement and plays venues throughout Los Angeles County and the United States.
