= Aaron Rehkop =

American politician (1891–1967)

Member of the Missouri Senate from the 17th district
- Incumbent
- Assumed office elected 1918

Personal details
- Born: March 10, 1891 near Higginsville, Missouri
- Died: November 3, 1967 (aged 76)
- Party: Republican
- Education: Central Wesleyan College; Northwestern University; Garrett Biblical Institute; University of Southern California; Drew University; Columbia University
- Occupation: politician, minister, teacher, soldier

Aaron Rehkop (March 10, 1891 - November 3, 1967) was an American politician from Warrensburg, Missouri, who served in the Missouri Senate. He served in the U.S. Army during World War I. Rehkop was first elected to the 17th Missouri senate district in 1918 by 256 votes in a Democratic-leaning district. He was educated at several different schools, receiving a bachelor of arts, a master of arts, a bachelor of divinity, a master of theology, and a doctor of theology.
