= Aaron Coundley =

Welsh rugby player

Aaron Coundley Mullen
- Born: Aaron Coundley; 18 October 1989 (age 37) Caerphilly, Wales
- Height: 1.83 m (6 ft 0 in)
- Weight: 108 kg (17 st 0 lb)

Rugby union career
Senior career
Years	Team	Apps	(Points)
2008–	Newport GD	17	(0)

Aaron Coundley (born 18 October 1989, Caerphilly) is a Welsh rugby union player. A prop forward, he currently plays his club rugby for Newport Gwent Dragons having progressed through the Dragons academy. He made his debut for the Dragons 11 October 2008 against Glasgow Warriors.

Coundley has represented the Wales national rugby union team at Under 16, Under 18 and Under 20 levels. He previously played for Blackwood RFC, Cross Keys RFC and Ebbw Vale RFC.
