= Aaron (amora) =

Jewish scholar

Aaron was an amora, who receives two brief mentions in the Babylonian Talmud. In both places he is represented as furnishing Ravina, head of the rabbinical academy at Sura from 488 to 499, and one of the editors of the Talmud, with information concerning the Baraitot (tannaitic traditions not embodied in the Mishnah) of which the latter was ignorant.
