= Aaron Ben-Zion ibn Alamani =

Egyptian judge

Aaron Ben-zion ibn Alamani was an Egyptian Dayyan, or judge, and prominent Jew of Alexandria in the twelfth century. His family name probably means al-Umani, or "the man of Oman" (Judah ha-Levi, "Diwan," ed. Harkavy, p. 180; Steinschneider, "Jew. Quart. Rev." xi. 486). His father, whose name was Joshua, was, it seems, a physician of some repute. It was at Aaron's house that Judah ha-Levi lived while in Alexandria; and the poet is extravagant in the praise of his friend, who, to judge from the titles given him, must have been a man of importance. Two of Ha-Levi's poems are addressed to Aaron: one of them he sent with a letter in rhymed prose, which letter is included in the "Diwan." Ha-Levi also mentions Aaron in a letter which he sent from Damietta to Samuel Nagid.
