= Aaron Tredway =

American soccer player (born 1976)

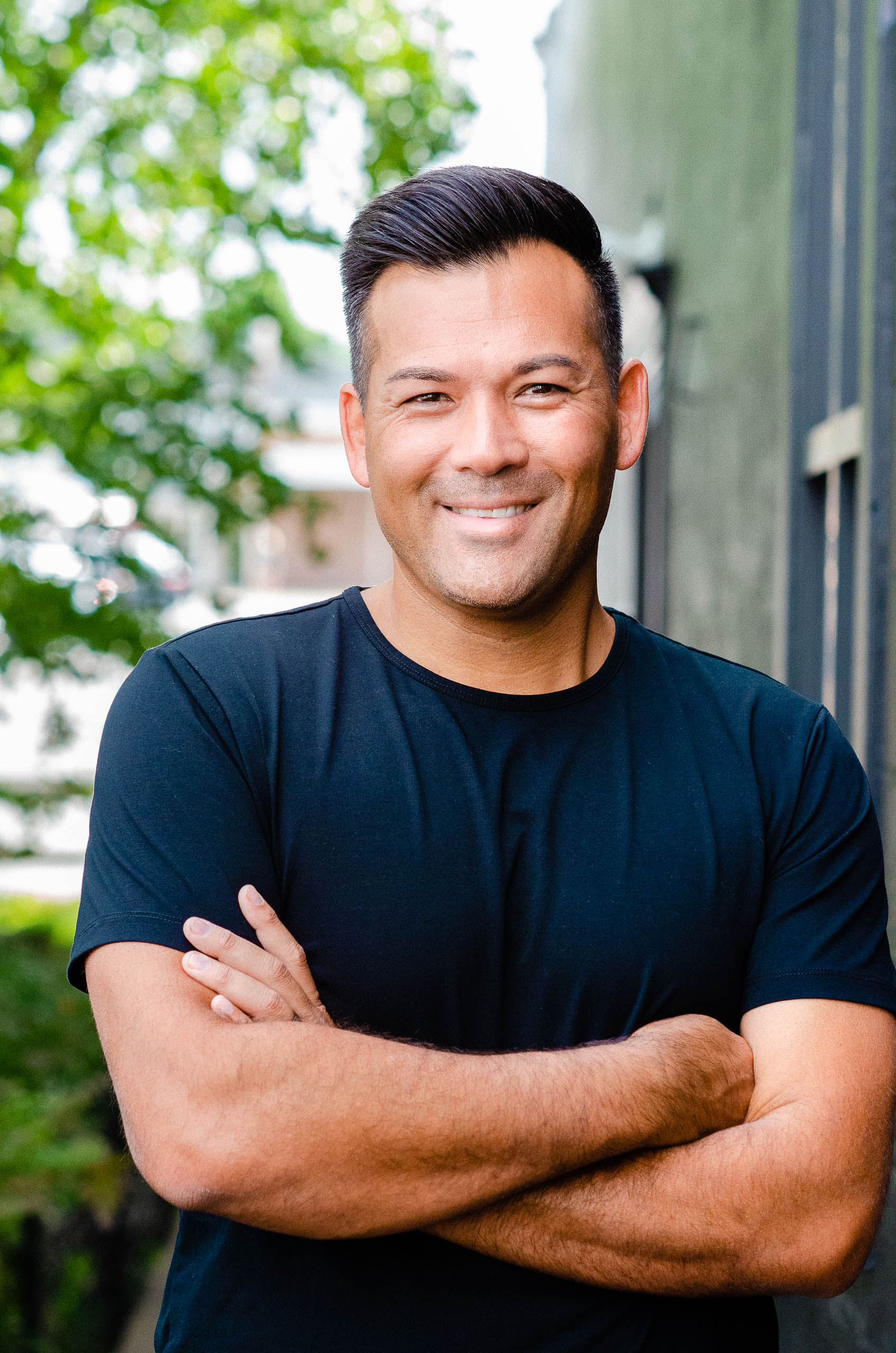
Tredway in 2022

Aaron Tredway (born February 27, 1976) is the lead pastor of Fellowship City Church and vice president of Ambassadors Football International.

== Early life and education ==
Tredway was born on February 27, 1976. He's a graduate of Liberty University and California State University, Stanislaus, and holds two degrees in physical education and two degrees in theology, including a doctorate of ministry.

== Career ==
In 2006, Aaron was the founder and executive director of the Cleveland City Stars, a professional soccer team based in Cleveland, Ohio.

After a twenty-year soccer career as a player, coach, and executive, Aaron now serves as the lead pastor of Fellowship City Church, a growing multisite church in Cleveland, Ohio.

Aaron is a speaker and consultant on the subject of leadership and has presented to several Fortune 500 companies. He also continues to mentor dozens of professional athletes around the world.

Aaron published his first book, To Who: A Competition for Glory, in conjunction with the 2010 FIFA World Cup in South Africa. To Who has sold over one hundred thousand copies to date and has been published on three continents.

In 2016, Aaron released his second book, Outrageous: Awake to the Unexpected Adventures of Everyday Faith, which highlights Aaron's belief that we all have an opportunity to wake up to a life far more exciting than we imagine. In his words, "He would much rather spend his time and energy traveling to the world’s most remote, underserved areas with a soccer ball than lead a safe life without purpose."

In his latest book, Don’t Miss Your Life: The Secret to Significance, Aaron shares his personal discovery of the secret to significance and invites you to live the life God created for you—a life pursuing significance rather than success.

== Personal life ==
He and his wife, Ginny, reside in Cleveland, Ohio, with their son, Noah.

== Authored Books ==
- To Who: A Competition for Glory. Aaron Tredway, 2014
- Outrageous: Awake to the Unexpected Adventures of Everyday Faith. Baker Books, 2016
- Don’t Miss Your Life: The Secret to Significance. BroadStreet Publishing, 2022
