= Aaron Rathborne =

English land surveyor

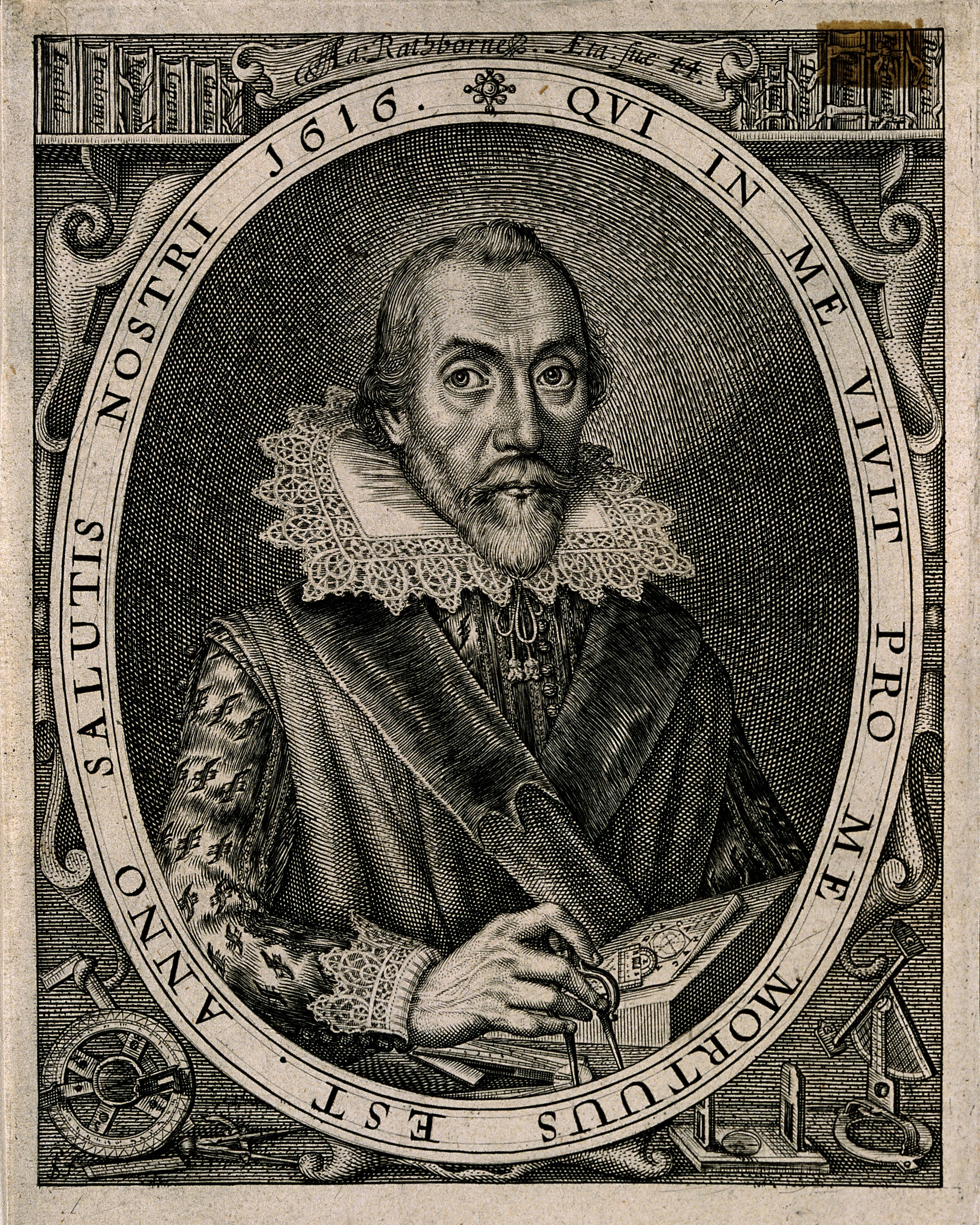
Engraving c. 1616

Aaron Rathborne (born 1571/2; fl. 1605–1622) was an English land surveyor who wrote a major text on surveying. Rathborne may have trained under the London mathematician John Goodwyn. He was involved in the Jacobean surveys of crown lands in Yorkshire, Cumberland, Durham, and Lincolnshire, and Suffolk.

Little is known about Rathborne but he is thought to have lived with Roger Bruges in the Strand, London. His major publication was The Surveyor in Foure Bookes (1616). This text described practical problems in surveying and noted the various errors in measurement and means for reducing them. Rathborne received a patent in 1618 to publish maps of London and Westminster. Rathborne was last noted in the estate business in North Riding of Yorkshire around 1622 and almost nothing is known of him after that date.
