= Aaron Roterfeld =

Austrian musician

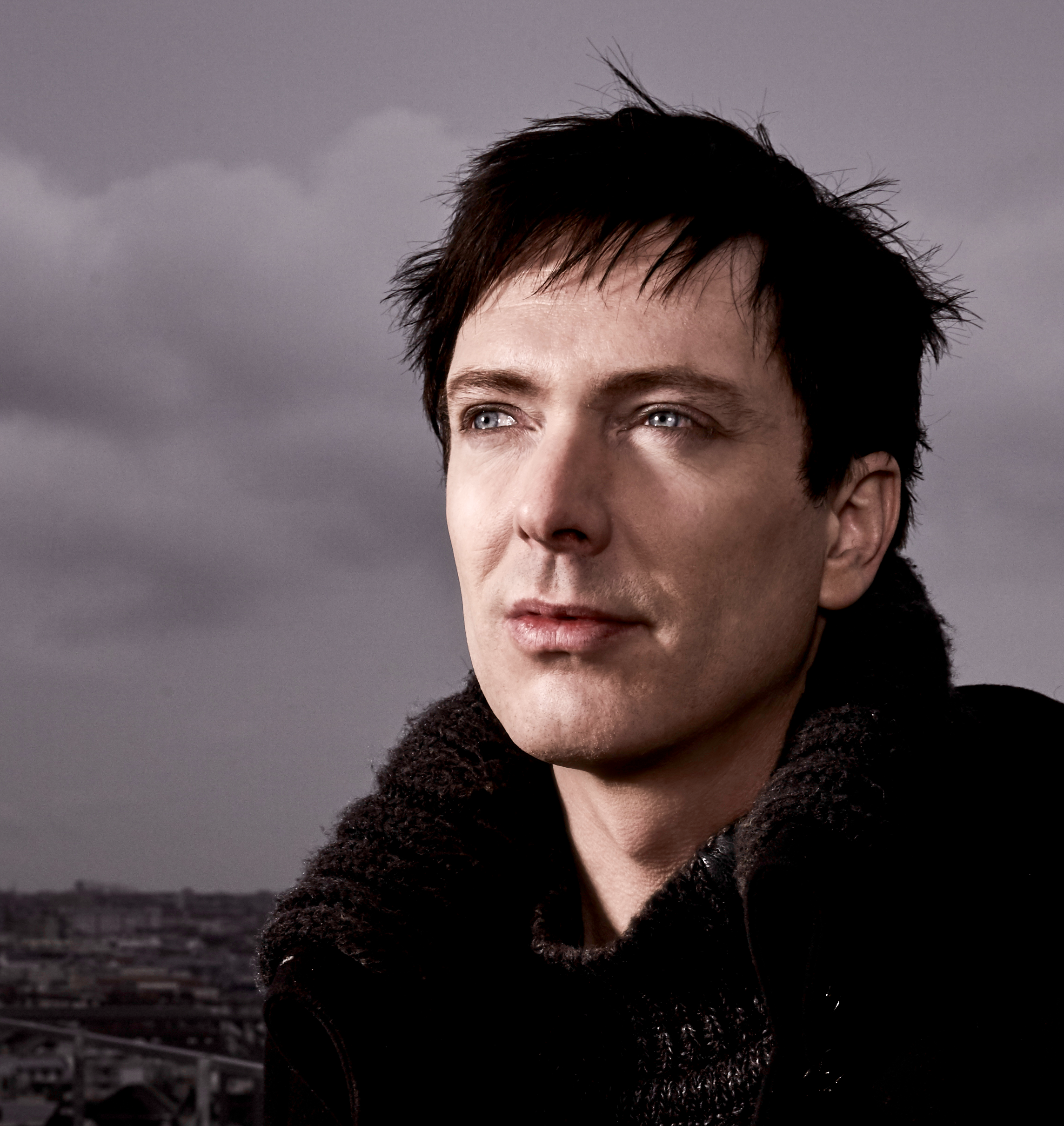
Aaron Roterfeld 2016

Aaron Roterfeld is an Austrian musician, who is the front man and songwriter for the band Roterfeld.

== Early life ==
Roterfeld was born in Innsbruck as Marnus Flatz. He was given piano lessons by various teachers, including his mother, who herself was a piano teacher, and began writing his own songs at the age of 12. Against his parents’ will, he dropped out of school at 17 and went to Africa, where he embarked on audacious expeditions across the Okavango Delta in Botswana on foot and then through the Eastern Highlands of Zimbabwe on horseback. He returned to Austria at the age of 18.

== Career ==
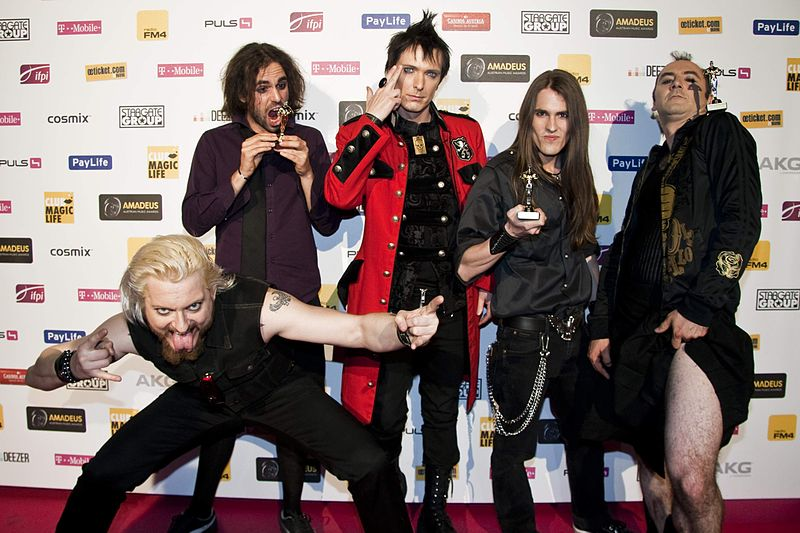
Roterfeld at the Amadeus Awards 2012

Roterfeld became a radio presenter at ORF, before moving on to a private radio station in 1998. In cooperation with this station, he set up a recording studio in 1999 and in 2001 developed an algorithm which enabled radio programmes to be controlled automatically by software.

He only came onto the music scene in 2011, when his song "STOP" from the album "Blood Diamond Romance" stayed in the top 10 of the German club charts (Deutsche Clubcharts, DAC) for 8 weeks.

In 2015, it emerged that he had spent some time songwriting in Lebanon. During a student demonstration there, he was hit by a tear gas projectile. Shortly after this, Roterfeld released an alternative music video to the song Blood Diamond Romance, which he dedicated to the students’ demands for more political transparency.

Aaron Roterfeld is actively engaged in education, humanitarian projects and animal protection.
