= Aaron Pugliese =

American screenwriter

Aaron Pugliese is an American writer, director and producer based in Los Angeles. He is the creator of the web syndicated television show Broke as a Joke.

Pugliese began his career working for Miramax as a college student at New York University. In 1999, after graduating from NYU, he sold a script called Honky which led to Hollywood rewrite work. Later in 2005 he took writing jobs for several productions in South Korea staffed by English speaking NYU alumni. When he returned to Los Angeles, Pugliese and David Lee McInnis, an American born actor working in the Korean entertainment industry, teamed up and produced the syndicated series "Broke as a Joke"
