= Aaron Fernandes =

Canadian field hockey player

Aaron Fernandes (born September 13, 1956) is a former field hockey player from Canada, who was member of the Men's National Team that finished in tenth position at the 1984 Summer Olympics in Los Angeles, California.

== International senior competitions ==
- 1984 – Olympic Games, Los Angeles (10th)
