= Aaron Kraten =

American artist

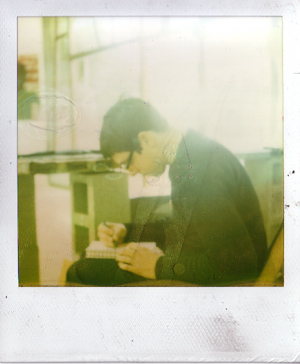
Aaron Kraten

Aaron Kraten is a mixed media artist from Costa Mesa, California.

== Early life ==
Aaron Kraten was born March 15, 1974, in San Francisco, California. As a child, he moved to Huntington Beach in Southern California. As a teenager, Aaron was very interested in skateboarding and counter culture. After high school, he worked full-time jobs while establishing himself as an artist, taking jobs in factories and working a stint as a courier. He gained recognition in the early 2000s, and subsequently set up a studio in a Costa Mesa loft on the East side.

== Work ==
Kraten is a mixed media artist, using found objects such as refrigerator doors and discarded windows to dismantled doghouses and old street signs as well as using nontraditional paint media such as correction fluid. He prefers to use his hands to work directly with the paint, giving a textured quality to the work; it is intriguing to note that brushes are never used in any of his pieces. Aaron is a self-taught artist.

One of his best known paintings is Coast 2007, It was entirely fingerpainted.

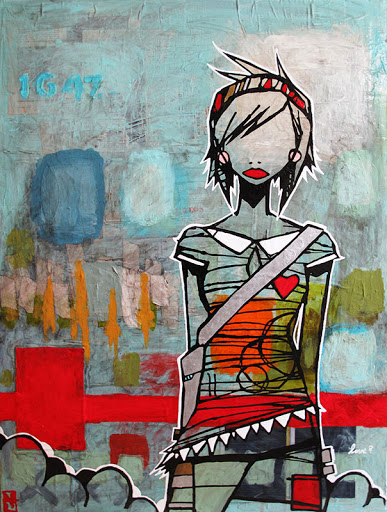
Coast

== History ==
Kraten grew up in Huntington Beach, California and spent many of his formative years drawing in 100-page sketchbooks, a practice he continues to this day. In 1999, while Kraten was working as a Vespa motorcycle mechanic, he experimented with painting on found objects. Kraten's first sales emerged after starting to display work in the thrift store, Stateside, at The Lab Anti-Mall where he was employed at the time, and sold a fair amount of it.

Soon after, Kraten began submitting his work to galleries and museums in Southern California. Kraten's work has been shown in museums such as the Laguna Art Museum; Museum of Contemporary Art, Los Angeles; and galleries such as Gallery 23; Gallery C; Seven Degrees; and Subject Matter. Kraten shows about four times a year and posts new work on his website often. Kraten has filled over 58 100-page sketchbooks and created over 350 paintings. In 2019 Aaron Kraten's art was featured in the video game Fortnite by Epic Games. He currently paints full-time.

== Past exhibitions ==
- Orange County Museum of Art (OCMA) - Newport Beach, California (group exhibition) "10/10" October 11, 2002
- Gallery 23 - Costa Mesa, California (group exhibition) "Dee Dee Ramone" May 12, 2002
- The Camp - Costa Mesa, California (group exhibition) "Remix" June 27, 2003
- 7 degrees - Laguna Beach, California (Solo exhibition) "Latest Works" September 1, 2003
- Laguna Art Museum - Laguna Beach, California (group exhibition) "21-art pack" October 13, 2003
- Gallery C - Redondo Beach, California (group exhibition) "Nine" July 29 - September 11, 2003
- Subject Matter - Costa Mesa, California (group exhibition) "Chapter 10" September 18, 2004
- The Kutting Room Gallery - Santa Monica, California (group exhibition) "Fontana Meets Kraten" October 2, 2004
- Wax Poetic - Burbank, California (Solo exhibit) "Latest Works" January 22, 2005
- Arena Gallery - Huntington Beach, California (Solo exhibit) "Latest Works" November 12, 2005
- Wax Poetic - Burbank, California (Solo exhibit) "Latest Works" January 22 - February 22, 2005
- Museum of Contemporary Art, Los Angeles - (group exhibit) "Fresh" June 4, 2005
- Venice Art Walk - Santa Monica, California (group exhibition) "This is Art" May 20, 2006
- Subject Matter - Costa Mesa, California (group exhibition) "Collabro" May 20, 2006
- Alpha Cult - Long Beach, California (Solo exhibition) "Exhibit A" August 26, 2006
- Gallery 1988 - Los Angeles, California (group exhibition) "I am 8bit" April 18 - May 19, 2006
- Think Space - Los Angeles, California (group exhibition) "pick of the harvest" September 8, 2006
- Alpha Cult - Long Beach, California (Solo exhibition) "Interdirectional" May 12, 2007
- Jack Flynn Gallery - Costa Mesa, California (group exhibition) "Urbanism" August 11, 2007
- The Pinch Gallery - Costa Mesa, California (group exhibition) "The White Album" August 27, 2007
- Alpha Cult - Long Beach, California (group exhibition) "21-art pack" October 13, 2007
- Koos Gallery - Long Beach, California (group exhibition) "Pop Music" December 15, 2007
- Laguna Art Museum - Laguna Beach, California (group exhibition) "100 Artist" February 9, 2008
- The Box Gallery - Costa Mesa, California (solo exhibition) January 12, 2008
- Wax Poetic - Burbank, California (Solo exhibit) "Latest Works" March 22, 2008
- Swiv Gallery - Oceanside, California (group exhibition) "Keep" November 12, 2008
- Project Artist Gallery - Philadelphia, Pennsylvania (Group exhibition) November 7, 2008
- Suite100 Gallery - Seattle, Washington (Group exhibition) November 14, 2009
- The Box Gallery - Costa Mesa, California (solo exhibition) January 17, 2009
- Halogen Gallery - Seattle, Washington (group exhibition) June 10, 2009
- Neue Transit Studio - Santa Ana, California (solo exhibition) June 10, 2009
- Neue Transit Studio - Santa Ana, California (solo exhibition) June 10, 2010
- Rothick Art Haus - Anaheim, California (group exhibition) "Doll Haus" April 9 - May 7, 2011
- Art Wino - Richmond, Virginia (group exhibit) "G40 the Summit" March 1–30, 2012
- Museum of Contemporary Art - Los Angeles - (group exhibit) "Fresh" March 24, 2012
- Rothick Art Haus - Anaheim, California (group exhibition) "7 Deadly Sins" April 14, 2012
- The Brink Gallery - Missoula, Montana (group exhibition) "On Deck" May 2, 2014
- Laguna Art Museum - Laguna Beach, California (group exhibit) "California Cool" February 7, 2015
- Rivet Gallery - Columbus, Ohio (group exhibition) "Be My Valentine" February 7, 2015
- Woot Bear Gallery - San Francisco, California (group exhibit) "Art on Guard" May 29, 2015
- The Silver Fern - Cookeville, Tennessee (group exhibit) "The Tiny Show" May 2, 2025
