= Aaron Edwin Penley =

English painter

Aaron Edwin Penley (20 May 1806 – 15 January 1870) was an English watercolour-painter.

== Biography ==
Born in 1806, he first appeared as a contributor to the Royal Academy exhibition in 1835. He continued to exhibit at intervals till 1857, his contributions being chiefly portraits, though he was afterwards better known as a landscape painter. He was elected a member of the New Water Colour Society (now the Royal Institute of Painters in Water Colours) in 1838, when he was living at 26 Percy Street, Rathbone Place, but he resigned in 1856, aggrieved in consequence of some alleged slight in connection with the placing of his pictures. At his own request, however, he was reinstated in 1859. He was watercolour-painter in ordinary to William IV and Queen Adelaide, he painted a miniature of Queen Victoria from a sitting (1840 NPG) and taught Victoria's son Prince Arthur to paint; he was also professor of drawing at Addiscombe College from 1851 to its dissolution, after which he held a similar post at Woolwich Academy till his death. In 1864 a mysterious advertisement, offering a reward for any information about Penley, ‘living or dead,’ appeared in several of the London newspapers. He died at Lewisham on 15 January 1870.

== Works ==
His art was of the showy, artificial kind, which was encouraged by the early popularity of chromolithography, and may be said to have become quite obsolete before his death.

An enthusiastic follower of his art, Penley published various elaborate treatises on its principles and practice, some of which are illustrated by chromolithography. Among them are his Elements of Perspective (1851), English School of Painting in Water Colours (1861), Sketching from Nature in Water Colours (1869), and A System of Water Colour Painting.
