= Aaron Maddron =

American IFBB professional bodybuilder (born 1970)

Aaron Maddron (born November 5, 1970, Portland, Oregon) is an American IFBB professional bodybuilder.

== Career ==
Maddron competed at 229 lbs. standing at 5 feet 10 inches tall. During his career as a professional bodybuilder, Maddron competed in a number of events placing very high and earning himself a big name in the bodybuilding industry. In 1999, he won the super heavy and overall championship title at the NPC Nationals. He also won the pro card at the championship that same year. Maddron developed his own personal workout which led to his success. He also made posing tapes which were produced by East Coast Muscle over at USA Muscle. In 2000, Maddron competed in his first pro show at the 2000 Toronto Pro, where he placed 10th. Maddron continued to train and compete through 2004. In 2001, he placed his highest, 9th place, at the San Francisco Pro and then later placed 17th at the GNC Show of Strength in 2004.

Maddron retired from bodybuilding before he was able to make it to the elite level of competing, placing in the top 3.

== Competitive History ==
- 1989 NPC Mr. Oregon Overall Teen, 1st
- 1990 NPC Mr. Oregon Overall Teen, 1st
- 1990 NPC Teen Nationals Heavyweight, 5th
- 1993 NPC Mr. Oregon Overall & Heavyweight, 1st
- 1995 NPC Pacific Coast Overall & Heavyweight, 1st
- 1995 NPC Pacific Coast Overall & Heavyweight, 1st
- 1996 NPC Junior Nationals Heavyweight, 2nd
- 1997 NPC USA Championships Heavyweight, 4th
- 1998 NPC Nationals Super Heavyweight, 2nd
- 1998 NPC USA Championships Super Heavyweight, 4th
- 1999 NPC Nationals Super Heavyweight & Overall, 4th
- 2000 IFBB Night of Champions 17th
- 2000 IFBB Toronto Pro Invitational 10th
- 2001 IFBB Arnold Schwarzenegger Classic 12th
- 2001 IFBB San Francisco Pro Invitational 9th
- 2003 IFBB Night of Champions 23rd
- 2003 IFBB Show of Strength Pro Championship 13th
