= Aaron (Copt) =

Saint venerated by the Coptic Orthodox Church

- Venerated in: Coptic Christianity
- Feast: May 16

Aaron was a Miaphysite Coptic saint, for whom several miracles were attributed, primarily in the Life of Aaron.

His apocryphal legend says of him, "When he was sick, he made roasted pigeons fly into his mouth." He has a feast in the Coptic Calendar of saints on May 16.
