= Aaron Fenster =

Aaron Fenster is a medical physicist at the University of Western Ontario Robarts Research Institute in London, Ontario, Canada. He was named a Fellow of the Institute of Electrical and Electronics Engineers (IEEE) in 2013 for his contributions to medical imaging and three-dimensional ultrasound-guided interventions. He is also a fellow of the Canadian Academy of Health Sciences and co-program director of the Ontario Institute for Cancer Research Imaging Program. He holds Ph.D. from the University of Toronto and received further training at the Ontario Cancer Institute.
