= Aaron Hillegass =

American author, developer, trainer and investor

- Born: April 30, 1969 (age 57)
- Occupation: Educator
- Years active: 2001–present

Aaron Hillegass (born 1969) Is the founder and former CEO of Big Nerd Ranch. He is best known to many programmers as the author of Objective-C: The Big Nerd Ranch Guide, Cocoa Programming for Mac OS X, and iOS Programming: The Big Nerd Ranch Guide.

== NeXT and Big Nerd Ranch ==
Between 1995 and 1997, he was employed at NeXT as a developer and trainer. In 1997, NeXT merged with Apple Computer. Hillegass elected to leave his role to start his own dot-com business. In 2000, he was then contracted by Apple to help train their software developers in the Cocoa application programming interface (API), an evolution of the NEXTSTEP API. This led to the creation of Big Nerd Ranch, a professional services company that provided training and consulting to developers and designers for iOS, Android, MacOS, and the web. In June of 2020, Big Nerd Ranch was sold to Amdocs and folded into their subsidiary Stellar Elements.

== New College of Florida ==
In January 2023, Hillegass became the Director of Applied Data Science at New College of Florida, in Sarasota.

On 8 April, 2023, in reaction to Florida Governor Ron DeSantis's decision to replace the leadership of New College and remake the school in the image of Hillsdale College, Hillegass gave notice that he would quit his position and rescind a $600,000 donation to the New College Foundation. His resignation letter was posted on Twitter and reprinted in the Wall Street Journal:

President Corcoran,

Hillsdale College is bad for America. It cultivates prejudice against immigrants, the LGBTQ+ community, minorities, and non-christians. It pushes a nativist and nationalistic agenda that would isolate the US from other nations.

When a governor guts the leadership of a state school in an effort to make a facsimile of Hillsdale, that is fascism. Not the shocking Kristallnacht-style fascism, but the banal fascism that always precedes it.

The nation is watching this experiment. If it is successful, the academic freedom of every state school under a conservative governor will be in peril. I love New College, but for the good of our nation, I hope the school fails miserably and conspicuously.

If I were more patriotic, I would burn the college’s buildings to the ground. However, the soft spot in my heart for the students and faculty who remain prevents this. Thus, I will (not outraged, just moved by a nagging sense of duty) vote with my feet, and simply walk away.

Note: I am taking the $600K that I pledged to the New College Foundation with me.

When my employment contract expires on August 22, I will not be renewing it.

Sincerely,

Aaron Hillegass

Director of Applied Data Science

== Georgia Tech and MIT ==
After Leaving New College, Hillegass taught computer science and entrepreneurship at Georgia Tech for six semesters.

He is now the Director of Curriculum and Instruction for the NEI Project at MIT.

== Kontinua Foundation ==
Aaron Hillegass is the founder of the Kontinua Foundation, which is developing a free self-paced STEM learning program to prepare high school students to enter a top-notch university engineering program.

== Investor ==
Aaron Hillegass is also an investor. In 2014, Forbes Magazine named him one of the top 10 amateur stock pickers in America after his portfolio on Marketocracy earned an average annual return of 16.2% over ten years.

Hillegass was the original angel investor in Greenlight Financial Technology, Inc.

== Bibliography ==
- Christian Keur; Aaron Hillegass; Joe Conway (2014). iOS Programming: The Big Nerd Ranch Guide. Big Nerd Ranch. 4th Edition (February 2014). ISBN 0-321-94205-1.
- Aaron Hillegass and Mikey Ward (2013). Objective-C Programming: The Big Nerd Ranch Guide. Big Nerd Ranch. 2nd Edition (November 2013). ISBN 0-321-94206-X.
- Aaron Hillegass and Adam Preble (2011). Cocoa Programming for Mac OS X. Addison-Wesley. 4th Edition (November 2011). ISBN 0-321-77408-6.
- Mark Dalrymple; Aaron Hillegass (2005). Advanced Mac OS X Programming. (Sept 2005). ISBN 978-0974078519.
