= Aaron D. Truesdell =

American politician

Member of the Michigan House of Representatives from the Washtenaw County district
- In office January 4, 1847 – March 17, 1847
- In office February 5, 1851 – December 31, 1852

Personal details
- Party: Whig

Aaron D. Truesdell was a Michigan politician.

== Career ==
Truesdell was a Whig. In an election spanning from November 5 to 6, 1838 Truesdell was elected to the position of Washtenaw County Commissioner. In this election, he received 2,144 votes. In 1840, Truesdell was re-elected to this position and received 2,487 votes.

On November 2, 1846, Truesdell was elected to the Michigan House of Representatives where he represented the Washtenaw County district from January 4, 1847 to March 17, 1847. During this term, he served on the Agriculture and Manufactures committee. On November 5, 1850, Truesdell was again elected to the Michigan House of Representatives where he represented the Washtenaw County district February 5, 1851 to December 31, 1852. During this second term, Truesdell served on the Harboring committee and the Printing committee.

== Personal life ==
Truesdell lived in Bridgewater Township, Michigan.
