= Aaron Kozak =

American playwright and filmmaker (born 1983)

- Born: Aaron Travis Kozak; August 23, 1983 (age 43); Nacogdoches, Texas, U.S.
- Occupations: Playwright, Filmmaker

Aaron Kozak (born August 23, 1983) is an American playwright and filmmaker.

== Early life ==
Kozak was born in Nacogdoches, Texas. After graduating from Grapevine High School, he went on to study theater at the University of Oklahoma (OU), where he earned a B.F.A. in Drama.

== Career ==
Kozak's inaugural play "Goodbye, Love. Goodbye, Joy. Hello, Travis McElroy" debuted to mixed reviews at Washington DC's Capital Fringe Festival in 2009. However, it was Kozak's sophomore drama "The Birthday Boys," which earned him international acclaim. The play dramatizes a Prisoner of War situation during the Iraq War, where three marines are bound and blindfolded for almost the entire play. In the 2010 world premiere run at the first annual Hollywood Fringe Festival, "The Birthday Boys" earned five major award nominations, including Best of the Festival, and won both the LA Fringe Critic's Choice Award and the Fringe First Award for Best World Premiere. In 2011, "The Birthday Boys" debuted off-Broadway to rave reviews, and became the first live theatre performed since the Vaudeville era at the historic Texas Theatre in Dallas. The run was listed as Dallas' top touring show of 2011, alongside the Broadway Tour of Billy Elliot the Musical. "The Birthday Boys" made its international debut at the National Institute of Dramatic Art in Sydney, Australia.

In 2012, Kozak joined the Los Angeles-based theatre company Theatre Unleashed as a resident artist, and his latest play, a western epic called "Round Rock", debuted to sold-out runs at the 2012 Fringe Festival and also earned another nomination for the Fringe First Award.

"The Birthday Boys," "Goodbye, Love. Goodbye, Joy. Hello, Travis McElroy," and Kozak's short play compilation "Short Plays for Sad People" are set to be published in 2013.

== Plays ==
- Birds and Bees of the Information Age (2013)
- The Pumpkin and Penguin Dialogues (2013)
- Love at First Fight (2013)
- Steers and Queers (2013)
- Bonkers (2013)
- Surrender Dorothy (2013)
- The Oak and The Reeds (2013)
- Round Rock (2012)
- The Birthday Boys (2010)
- Goodbye, Love. Goodbye, Joy. Hello, Travis McElroy. (2009)

== Filmography ==
- The Show Businessman (2009)
- Basketball Shorts (2008)
- The Night Audit (2004)
