= Aaron Grainger =

Australian rugby league footballer

Personal information
- Full name: Aaron Grainger
- Born: 16 May 1978 (age 46)

Playing information
Club
| Years | Team | Pld | T | G | FG | P |
|---|---|---|---|---|---|---|
| 1998 | Newcastle Knights | 2 | 0 | 0 | 0 | 0 |
- As of 15 Jul 2021

Aaron Grunger (born 16 May 1978) is an Australian former professional rugby league footballer who played in the 1990s. He played at club level for the Newcastle Knights in 1998.
