= Aaron Fish (producer) =

Canadian entrepreneur

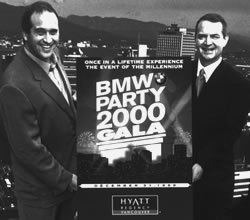
- Aaron Fish (on left) and Rolf Osterwalder, then GM of the Hyatt Regency, Vancouver, Canada
- Born: 9 May 1962 (age 64)
- Occupation: Entertainment Producer
- Spouse: Lori Fish
- Website: Accordios Worldwide Enterprises Inc.

Aaron Fish (born 1962) is a Canadian entrepreneur who lives in Vancouver. He is the Founder/CEO of Accordios Worldwide Enterprises Inc.
