= Aaron (surname) =

Origin
- Meaning: "lofty"
- Region of origin: Hebrew

Other names
- Variant forms: Aarons, Aaronson, Aron

Aaron is primarily a Jewish surname derived from the given name Aaron. There are several surname variants including Aarons, Aaronson, and Aron. Not all occurrences of the surname are Jewish.

== Surname ==
- Abe Aaron (1910–1970), Canadian jazz clarinetist and saxophonist
- Abraham ben Aaron, Palestinian Gaonate head in the 10th century
- Anne Aaron, Filipina engineer
- Arthur Aaron (footballer) (1885–1950), English footballer
- Arthur Louis Aaron (1922–1943), British fighter pilot, posthumous recipient of the Victoria Cross
- Barney Aaron (1800–1859), English bare-knuckle boxer
- Young Barney Aaron (1836–1907), English boxer, son of Barney Aaron
- Ben Aaron (born 1981), American media personality
- Benjamin Aaron (1915–2007), American lawyer
- Billye Aaron (born 1936), American television host
- Catrin Aaron, Welsh actress
- Caroline Aaron (born 1952), American actress
- Charles Aaron, American music journalist and editor
- Charles Dettie Aaron (1866–1951), American gastroenterologist
- Chavela Aaron, American taekwondo and karate practitioner
- Chester Aaron (1923–2019), American writer
- Chidinma Aaron (born 1993), Nigerian model and entrepreneur
- Chuck Aaron (born 1948), American aviator
- Chloe Aaron (1938–2020), American television executive
- Clarence Aaron, American recipient of a presidential commutation
- Daniel Aaron (1912–2016), American writer and academic
- Dave Aaron (1911–1992), American football and basketball coach
- David L. Aaron (born 1938), American diplomat and writer
- George Aaron (born 1963), Italian singer
- Hank Aaron (1934–2021), American baseball player
- Harold Robert Aaron (1921–1980), United States Army general
- Henry J. Aaron (born 1936), American economist
- Huw Aaron (born 1980), Welsh cartoonist and author
- Isaac Aaron (1804–1877), English physician
- Israel Aaron (1859–1912), American rabbi and scholar
- Jacob ben Aaron (died 1855), Russian rabbi and author
- Jane Aaron (1948–2015), American filmmaker and book illustrator
- Jane Aaron (educator) (born 1951), Welsh educator
- Jason Aaron (born 1973), American comic book writer
- Jesse Aaron (1887–1979), American sculptor
- John Aaron (born 1943), American NASA engineer
- Jonathan Aaron (born 1941), American poet
- Jonne Aaron (born 1983), Finnish singer
- Judge Edward Aaron (1923–1991), African-American handyman
- Justice Aaron (fl. 1980s–2020s), known as Metaform, American music producer
- Lee Aaron (born 1962), Canadian rock singer
- Lil Aaron (born 1994), American singer
- Madeline Aaron (born 1994), American pair skater
- Manuel Aaron (born 1935), Indian chess player
- Max Aaron (born 1992), American figure skater
- Michele Aaron, British film scholar and author
- M. Robert Aaron (1922–2007), American electrical engineer
- Quinton Aaron (born 1984), American actor
- Paul Aaron (born 1943), American film director and producer
- Rachel Aaron (born c.1982), American science fiction and fantasy writer
- Richard Aaron (1901–1987), Welsh philosopher
- Richard E. Aaron (1949–2016), American photographer
- Robert Aaron (born 1955), Canadian jazz musician
- Sam Aaron (1911–1996), American businessman
- Samuel Aaron (1800–1865), American teacher and minister
- Soazig Aaron (born 1949), French author
- Stephen Aaron-Sipple (born 1987), English actor
- Susan Aaron-Taylor (born 1947), American artist
- Teodor Aaron (1803–1867), Romanian Greek Catholic priest and historian
- Tim Aaron, American musician
- Timothy Francis Donovan Aaron (1853–1929), American politician from New Jersey
- Tommie Aaron (1939–1984), American baseball player and coach
- Tommy Aaron (born 1937), American professional golfer
- Tossi Aaron (died 2018), American folk singer
- Varun Aaron (born 1989), Indian cricketer
- Vasile Aaron (1770–1822), Romanian poet and author
- Victor Aaron (1956–1996), Native American actor

=== See also ===
- Aarons (surname)
- Aron (name)
- Arons, given name and surname
- Arron, given name and surname
- Aaronson, surname
