= Aharon =

- Gender: Masculine
- Language: Hebrew

Origin
- Meaning: "Of the Mountain", or "Mountaineer".

Other names
- See also: Aaron, Ahron, Aron, Haarūn, Hārūn

Aharon אַהֲרֹן is the masculine given name original spelling, commonly in Israel, of the later version Aaron, prominent biblical figure in the Old Testament, "Of the Mountains", or "Mountaineer". There are other variants including "Ahron" and "Aron". Aharon is also occasionally a patronymic surname, usually in the form Ben-Aharon.

== Given name ==
- Aharon Abuhatzira (1938–2021), Israeli politician
- Aharon Amar (born 1937), Israeli footballer
- Aharon Amir (1923–2008), Israeli poet, translator, and writer
- Aharon Amram (born 1939), Israeli singer, composer, poet, and researcher
- Aharon Appelfeld (1932–2018), Israeli novelist and Holocaust survivor
- Aharon April (1932–2020), Russian artist
- Aharon Barak (born 1936), Israeli lawyer and jurist
- Aharon Becker (1905–1995), Israeli politician
- Aharon Ben-Shemesh (1889–1988), Israeli writer, translator, and lecturer
- Aharon Chelouche (1840–1920), Algerian landowner, jeweler, and moneychanger
- Aharon Cohen (1910–1980), Israeli politician
- Aharon Danziger, Israeli Paralympic volleyball player
- Aharon Davidi (1927–2012), Israeli general
- Aharon Dolgopolsky (1930–2012), Russian-Israeli linguist
- Aharon Doron (1922–2016), Israeli general and educator
- Aharon Efrat (1911–1989), Israeli politician
- Aharon Feldman (born 1932), American rabbi
- Aharon Galstyan (born 1970), Armenian-Russian serial killer
- Aharon Gershgoren (born 1948), Israeli footballer
- Aharon Gluska (born 1951), Israeli-American painter
- Aharon Goldstein (1902–1976), Israeli politician
- Aharon Gurevich, Russian rabbi
- Aharon HaLevi (1235– c. 1290), Spanish rabbi, scholar, and Halakhist
- Aharon Haliva (born 1967), Israeli Major general
- Aharon Harel (1932–2000), Israeli politician
- Aharon Hoter-Yishai, Israeli Military Advocate General
- Aharon Ibn Hayyim (1545–1632), Moroccan scholar
- Aharon Ipalé (1941–2016), Israeli-American actor
- Aharon Isser (1958–1995), Israeli aeronautical engineer
- Aharon Jacobashvili (born 1964), Israeli boxer
- Aharon of Karlin (I) (1736–1772), Polish-Lithuanian rabbi
- Aharon of Karlin (II) (1802–1872), Russian rabbi
- Aharon Kapitulnik (born 1953), Israeli-American physicist
- Aharon Katzir (1914–1972), Israeli chemist
- Aharon Keshales (born 1976), Israeli film director, screenwriter, and film critic
- Aharon Moshe Kiselev (1866–1949), Russian-Manchurian rabbi
- Yitzhak Aharon Korff, American rabbi
- Aharon Kotler (1892–1962), Lithuanian-American rabbi
- Aharon Lichtenstein (1933–2015), French rabbi
- Aharon Megged (1920–2016), Israeli author and playwright
- Aharon Meskin (1898–1974), Israeli stage actor
- Aharon Mor (born 1947), Polish-Israeli civil servant
- Aharon Mordechai Rokeach (born 1975), Israeli rabbi
- Aharon Nahmias (1932–1998), Israeli politician
- Aharon Perlow of Koidanov (1839–1897) – third Rebbe of Koidanov
- Aharon Pfeuffer (1949–1993), Israeli rabbi
- Avraham Aharon Price (1900–1994), Canadian scholar, writer, educator, and community leader
- Aharon Razel (born 1974), Israeli musician
- Aharon Razin (1935–2019), Israeli biochemist
- Aharon Remez (1919–1994), Israeli civil servant, politician, diplomat, and Air Force commander
- Aharon Rokeach (1880–1957), Ukrainian rabbi
- Aharon Roth (1894–1947), Hungarian rabbi and scholar
- Aharon Shabtai (born 1939), Israeli poet and translator
- Aharon Leib Shteinman (1914–2017), Israeli rabbi
- Aharon Shulov (1907–1997), Israeli entomologist
- Aharon Sorasky (born 1940), Israeli author
- Aharon Uzan (1924–2007), Israeli politician
- Aharon Wasserman (born 1986), American entrepreneur and software designer
- Aharon Yadlin (1926–2022), Israeli educator and politician
- Aharon Yariv (1920–1994), Israeli politician and general
- Aharon Ze'evi-Farkash (born 1948), Israeli general
- Aharon Zisling (1901–1964), Israeli politician and minister
- Aharon Zorea (born 1969), American historian
- Aharon of Zhitomir, Ukrainian rabbi

== Surname ==
- Dudu Aharon (born 1984), Israeli singer-songwriter, musician, and composer
- Michal Aharon, Israeli computer scientist
- Shay Aharon (born 1978), Israeli retired footballer
- Yossi Aharon, Israeli bouzouki player

== See also ==
- Ben-Aharon (surname)
- Beis Aharon Synagogue of Karlin-Stolin, Jerusalem
- Ahron
- Aron (name)
- Aaron (given name)
- Aaron (surname)
