= Shlomo =

- Gender: Male

Other names
- Alternative spelling: שְׁלֹמֹה, Szlomo
- Related names: Shloime

Shlomo or Szlomo is the English form of שְׁלֹמֹה, the Hebrew name of the Israelite King Solomon. It is a popular name among Jews, especially in Israel.

== As a mononym ==
- Solomon, king of ancient Israel
- SK Shlomo (born 1983), beatboxer previously known as just Shlomo
- Shlohmo (born 1990) or Henry Laufer, American electronic musician

== As a given name ==
=== Shlomo ===
- Shlomo Amar (born 1948), former Sephardi Chief Rabbi of Israel and current Sephardi Chief Rabbi of Jerusalem
- Shlomo Argov (1929–2003), Israeli diplomat whose attempted assassination led to the 1982 Lebanon War
- Shlomo Aronson (disambiguation), multiple people
- Shlomo Artzi (born 1949), Israeli singer and composer
- Shlomo Zalman Auerbach (1910–1995), Rosh Yeshiva of the Kol Torah yeshiva in Israel
- Shlomo Aviner (born 1943), Israeli Rosh Yeshiva of the Ateret Cohanim
- Shlomo Avineri (1933–2023), Professor of Political Science, Hebrew University, Jerusalem
- Shlomo Bar (born 1943), Israeli musician and composer
- Shlomo Bar-Shavit (1928–2019), Israeli actor and director
- Shlomo Baum (1929–1999), Israeli military commando fighter
- Shlomo Ben-Ami (born 1943), Israeli diplomat, politician and historian
- Shlomo-Yisrael Ben-Meir (1910–1971), Israeli politician and member of the Knesset
- Shlomo Ben-Yosef (1913–1938), member of the Revisionist Zionist underground Irgun
- Shlomo Benizri (born 1961), former Israeli Labour and Welfare Minister
- Shlomo Bentin (1946–2012), professor of Psychology at the Hebrew University of Jerusalem
- Shlomo Bohbot (born 1942), Israeli politician and member of the Knesset
- Shlomo Breznitz (born 1936), Israeli author, psychologist, and president of the University of Haifa
- Shlomo Carlebach or Reb Shlomo (1925–1994), American Jewish rabbi, religious teacher, composer, and singer
- Shlomo Carlebach (scholar) (1925–2022), German-born American Haredi rabbi and scholar
- Shlomo Cohen (born 1941), Israeli diplomat
- Shlomo Cohen-Tzidon (1923–2012), Israeli politician and member of the Knesset
- Shlomo Cunin, American Hasidic rabbi
- Shlomo Dayan (born 1952), Israeli rabbi and former member of the Knesset
- Shlomo Dovrat, Israeli high-tech entrepreneur
- Shlomo Dykman (1917–1965), Polish-born Israeli translator and classical scholar
- Shlomo Eckstein (1929–2020), Israeli economist and President of Bar-Ilan University
- Shlomo Eitan, Hebrew language linguist
- Shlomo Eliahu (born 1936), Israeli businessman and former member of the Knesset
- Shlomo Elyashiv (1841–1926), Lithuanian Orthodox rabbi
- Shlomo Erell (1920–2018), Commander of the Israeli Navy
- Shlomo Freifeld (1925–1990), American Orthodox rabbi
- Shlomo Ganzfried (1804–1886), Hungarian Orthodox rabbi and author
- Shlomo Gazit (1926–2020), Israeli former head of IDF military intelligence, President of Ben-Gurion University
- Shlomo Glickstein (born 1958), Israeli tennis player
- Shlomo Goldman or Zvhil-Sanzer rebbe (1947–2017), American Hasidic rabbi
- Shlomo Goren (1917–1994), Orthodox Ashkenazi Chief Rabbi of Israel
- Shlomo Grofman, Israeli real estate developer
- Shlomo Gronich (born 1949), Israeli composer, singer-songwriter, and choir conductor
- Shlomo-Ya'akov Gross (1908–2003), Israeli politician and member of the Knesset
- Shlomo HaKohen (Vilna) (1828–1905), Lithuanian Orthodox rabbi
- Shlomo HaKohen of Greece, 18th century mekubal and posek
- Shlomo HaKohen of Lissa, 18th century rabbi and biblical commentator
- Shlomo Halberstam (first Bobover rebbe) (1847–1905), first Bobover Rebbe
- Shlomo Halberstam (third Bobover rebbe) (1907–2000), third Bobover Rebbe
- Shlomo Havlin (born 1942), professor in the Department of Physics at Bar-Ilan University, Ramat-Gan, Israel
- Shlomo Heiman (1892–1944), rabbi, Talmudist, and rosh yeshiva
- Shlomo Helbrans (1962–2017), Israeli-born cult leader
- Shlomo Hillel (1923–2021), Israeli Police and Interior Minister and Speaker of the Knesset
- Shlomo Jin, one of the first of the Kaifeng Jews to make aliyah; see Chinese in Israel
- Shlomo Kaplansky (1884–1950), Israeli politician and President of the Technion – Israel Institute of Technology
- Shlomo Katz (born 1980), religious Jewish singer in Israel
- Shlomo Lahat (1927–2014), eighth mayor of Tel Aviv
- Shlomo Lahiani (born 1965), business owner and former Israeli politician
- Shlomo Levi (1934–2003), Israeli footballer
- Shlomo Levinger (born 1997), American magician
- Shlomo Lipetz (born 1979), Israeli baseball player
- Shlomo Ephraim Luntschitz (1550–1619), rabbi, poet and Torah commentator
- Shlomo Miller, member of the Moetzes Gedolei HaTorah (Council of Torah Sages)
- Shlomo Mintz (born 1957), Israeli violin virtuoso
- Shlomo Molla (born 1965), Israeli politician
- Shlomo Moussaieff (rabbi) (1852–1922), one of the founders of the Bukharian Quarter in Jerusalem
- Shlomo Moussaieff (businessman) (1925–2015), Israeli born millionaire businessman
- Shlomo Nahari (born 1934), Israeli footballer
- Shlomo Pines (1908–1990), Israeli scholar of Jewish and Islamic philosophy
- Shlomo Rabinowicz (1801–1866), the first Rebbe of the Radomsk Hasidic dynasty
- Shlomo Chanoch Rabinowicz (1882–1942), fourth Radomsker Rebbe in Poland
- Shlomo Rechnitz, American businessman and philanthropist
- Shlomo Riskin (born 1940), founder of the Lincoln Square Synagogue in New York City
- Shlomo Sand (born 1946), Israeli historian
- Shlomo Sawilowsky (1954–2021), professor of educational statistics, Wayne State University
- Shlomo Scharf (born 1943), Israeli football manager
- Shlomo Zalman Schneersohn (1830–1900), Ukrainian Habad Hasidic rabbi
- Shlomo Shirazi (born 1960), Israeli footballer
- Shlomo Simcha, UK-born Canadian Hasidic Jewish cantor and singer
- Shlomo Sternberg (1936–2024), American mathematician known for his work in geometry
- Shlomo Sztencl (1884–1919), Rav of Tzelodz and Sosnowiec, Poland
- Shlomo Tzemah (born 1981), Israeli footballer
- Shlomo Veingrad, formerly Alan Veingrad (born 1963), American NFL football player
- Shlomo Venezia (1923–2012), Greek-born Italian Jew
- Shlomo Weber (born 1949), economics professor and president, New Economic School in Moscow, Russia
- Shlomo Elisha Wiesel (born 1972), chief information officer of Goldman Sachs; hedge fund manager of the Niche Plus; son of Elie Wiesel
- Shlomo Zilberstein (born 1960), Israeli-American computer scientist
- Shlomo Zev Zweigenhaft (1915–2005), Rosh Hashochtim of Poland, Chief Rabbi of Hannover & Lower Saxony

=== Szlomo ===
- Szlomo Benjamin Fisz (1922–1989), Polish film producer and writer
- Szlomo Szmajzner (1927–1989), survivor of the Sobibór extermination camp
- Szlomo Zalman Lipszyc (1765–1839), Orthodox rabbi, and first Chief Rabbi of Warsaw

=== Fictional characters ===
- Shlomo, a South Park character appearing in the episode "Jewbilee"

== Organizations ==
- Shlomo Group (founded 1974), an international holding group based in Israel

== See also ==
- Hebrew name
- Š-L-M, the triconsonantal Semitic root
- Solomon (name)
