= Ben-Aharon =

Origin
- Meaning: "son of mountaineer"
- Region of origin: Hebrew

Other names
- Variant forms: Aarons, Aaronson, Aaronsohn, Aron

Ben-Aharon is a patronymic surname most commonly found in Israel, originating from "Aaron" (meaning "lofty") of the Old Testament, and meaning "son of mountaineer". There are several patronym surname variants including "Aharonson", "Aaronson", and "Aaronsohn". Aharon is a Hebrew masculine given name common in Israel. Notable people with the surname Ben-Aharon include:

- Jesaiah Ben-Aharon (born 1955), Israeli philosopher
- Yitzhak Ben-Aharon (1906–2006), Israeli politician

Variants

- Michal Aharon, Israeli computer scientist
- Oded Aharonson, American assistant professor of planetary science at the California Institute of Technology

== See also ==
- Aarons (disambiguation)
- Aaronson
- Aaronsohn
- Aron (disambiguation)
