= Agron =

Agron may refer to:

== People ==
- Agron (given name)
- Agron (surname)

== Fictional and legendary characters ==
- Agron (mythology), a figure in Greek mythology
- Agron of Lydia, fourth king of Maeonia
- Agron, a character on American television show Spartacus

== Other uses ==
- Agron (dictionary), Saadia Gaon's reference work
- Agrón, a town in southern Spain
- Agron House, a landmark in Jerusalem

== See also ==
- Agron J, shorthand for the Agronomy Journal
