= Arons =

Arons is both a surname, the plural of the given name and surname Aron (name), and the Latvian spelling of the given name Aaron (given name) and surname Aaron (surname) as Arons or Ārons. Notable people with the given name and surname include:

== Given name ==
- Ārons Bogoļubovs (born 1938), Latvian judoka
- Arons Galanterniks (1921–1942), Latvian football player
- Arons Levins (1909–1941), Latvian football player
- Ārons Nimcovičs, birth name of Aron Nimzowitsch (1886–1935), Latvian-Russian-born Danish chess player and writer
- Arons Nuroks (fl. 1875–1931), Latvian rabbi and politician
- Arons Papirmeisters (1886–c. 1934), Latvian merchant, public figure and member of the People's Council of Latvia

== Surname ==
- Bruno Arons, birth name of Bruno Ahrends (1878–1948), German architect
- Carola Arons (born 1971), Dutch actress
- Ed Arons (1948–2026), Dutch journalist
- Elyce Arons (fl. from 1981), American entrepreneur and fashion executive
- Feliks Arons (1944–1992), Dutch actor and director
- Ilya Arons (1910–1983), Russian Soviet documentary filmmaker and cinematographer
- Jacob Arons (1882–1943), Dutch physician and board member of the Jewish Council for Amsterdam
- Jeff Arons (born 1960), American tennis player
- Jonathan Arons (born 1943), American astrophysicist
- Kalmans Arons, birth name of Kalman Aron (1924–2018), Latvian-born American Holocaust survivor and artist
- Kārlis Ēriks Arons (1933–2005), Latvian medical historian
- Leo Arons (1860–1919), born Martin Leo Arons, German physicist and politician
- Lukas Arons (born 1968), Dutch sculptor
- Matīss Ārons (1858–1939), Latvian bibliographer, critic and journalist
- Paul Arons (1861–1932), German banker and lawyer
- Philipp Arons (1821–1902), German painter
- Rich Arons (born 1958), American animator, director, producer, and screenwriter
- Samuel Arons (1812–1865), Surinamese painter
- Sanne Arons (born 2005), Dutch football player
- Wendy Arons (born 1964), American dramatist, drama professor, and critic

== See also ==
- Aaron (disambiguation)
- Aarons (disambiguation)
- Aron (disambiguation)
- Arron (disambiguation)
- Alberto Arons de Carvalho (born 1949; second name Arons), Portuguese journalist, politician and university professor
- Arons & Gelauff, Dutch architectural firm
