= Isser (name) =

Isser (Hebrew: איסר), also transliterated as Issur, is a masculine name and surname of Yiddish origin, derived from the Hebrew name Israel, and surname of Austrian origin.

== Given name ==
- Isser Be'eri (1901–1958), Israeli director of military intelligence
- Issur Demsky or Kirk Douglas (1916–2020), American actor
- Isser Harel (1912–2003), Israeli spymaster
- Isser Zalman Meltzer (1870–1953), Lithuanian Orthodox rabbi and scholar
- Isser Yehuda Unterman (1886–1976), Ashkenazi Chief Rabbi of Israel
- Isser Woloch (born 1937), historian of the French Revolution

== Surname ==
- Aharon Isser (1958–1995), Israeli aeronautical engineer
- Franz Isser (1932–2024), Austrian bobsledder
- Fritz Isser, Austrian bobsledder
- Heinrich Isser (1928–2004), Austrian bobsledder
- Josef Isser, Austrian luger
- Maria Isser (1929–2011), Austrian luger
- Paul Isser, Austrian luger

== See also ==
- Isser (disambiguation)
- Israel (name)
