= Aronson =

Aronson is a surname. Notable people with the surname include:

- Alex Aronson (1934–1975), Dutch aid worker
- Alex Aronson (author) (1912–1995), German-born Israeli author and educator
- Billy Aronson, American playwright
- Boris Aronson (1898–1980), American artist and set designer
- Chaim Aronson (1825–1893), Lithuanian inventor and memoirist in Tsarist Russia
- Donald Aronson (1929–2019), American mathematician
- Doug Aronson (born 1964), American football player
- Elliot Aronson, American psychologist
- Eva Aronson (1908–1999), American chess master
- Irene Aronson (1918–1992), American painter and printmaker
- J. Hugo Aronson (1891–1978), American politician
- James Aronson (1915–1988), American journalist
- Jan Aronson, American artist
- Jason Aronson, American psychologist and founder of Jason Aronson publishing
- Joshua Aronson, American psychologist
- Judie Aronson, American actress
- Letty Aronson, American film producer, sister of Woody Allen
- Marita Aronson, Swedish politician
- Max Aronson, birth name of American film actor Broncho Billy Anderson (1880–1971)
- Naoum Aronson (1874–1943), Russian-born sculptor who worked mostly in France
- Raney Aronson-Rath, American documentary filmmaker and television producer
- Rudolph Aronson (1856–1919), American composer
- Sam Aronson (1942–2026), American physicist
- Shlomo Aronson (disambiguation), multiple people
- Stanisław Aronson, Polish and Israeli army officer
- Stina Aronson (1892–1956), Swedish writer
- Theo Aronson (1929–2003), South Africa-born biographer of English royals

== See also ==
- Aaronson
