= Yossi =

Yossi is a Hebrew given name, typically a short and affectionate nickname for Yosef (equivalent to English Joseph). It may refer to:

== People ==
- Abba Yossi – mythology figure
- Country Yossi – American singer and radio personality
- Yossi Abu – Israeli executive officer
- Yossi Abukasis – Israeli football player
- Yossi Aharon – musician and Greek bouzouki player
- Yossi Alpher – Israeli political activist
- Yossi Banai – Israeli actor, singer and playwright
- Yossi Beilin – Israeli politician (former minister in the Israeli government)
- Jose ben Halafta (aka Rabbi Yossi) – Jewish tanna
- Yossi Ben Hanan – Israeli general
- Yossi Benayoun (born 1980) – Israeli football player
- Yossi Cedar – Israeli filmmaker
- Yossi Dagan – Israeli activist
- Yossi Dahan – Israeli scholar and activist
- Yossi Dashti (born 1952), Israeli-American author, researcher and business facilitator
- Yossi Ghinsberg – Israeli adventurer, author, entrepreneur, humanitarian, and motivational speaker
- Yossi Green – Jewish American composer
- Yossi Harel – Israeli military person
- Yossi Katz – Israeli politician
- Yossi Katz (geographer), Israeli professor in political geography
- Yossi Klafter - Israeli chemical physics professor, the eighth President of Tel Aviv University
- Yossi Klein Halevi – Israeli journalist and writer
- Yossi Maiman – Israeli businessman
- Yossi Melman – Israeli journalist and writer
- Yossi Mizrahi – Israeli former football player and coach
- Yosef Paritzky, commonly referred to as Yossi Paritzky – Israeli politician and attorney
- Yossi Peled – Israeli politician and general
- Yossi Sarid – Israeli politician (former minister in the Israeli government)
- Yossi Shain – Israeli scholar and politician
- Yossi Shekel – Israeli football player
- Yossi Shivhon – Israeli football player
- Yossi Vardi – Israeli entrepreneur

== Cinema and television ==
- Yossi & Jagger, a 2002 Israeli television film
- Yossi, the 2012 film sequel to Yossi & Jagger

== Literature ==
- Joseph Blumenthal (character) – character in The Hope by Herman Wouk
