= Agron (surname) =

Agron refers to two surnames with the same spelling, one Jewish and one Hispanic.

== Etymology ==
As such, there are two origins, the Hebrew Agron (אגרון) and (with Slavic suffix) Agronsky, and the Spanish and Galician Agrón.

Per the Museum of the Jewish People, the Jewish names are patronymics of the biblical Aaron, first high priest of the Jews and brother of Moses, and are two of many Jewish surnames related to him. In the United States, the surname is transliterated from "Ahron" in Eastern Europe usage, though "Agron" and "Ogron" were commonly used in Russia. Talmudic scholar Heinrich Guggenheimer suggested that "Agron" and "Agronsky", as well as "Agrin", were variations on "Agranoff"; not knowing the origin, the Guggenheimers wrote these and similar names were perhaps patronymics of Agra, a word in the Talmud meaning "reward".

The Hispanic name is a habitational surname, directly meaning "by the dry ground" and deriving from two towns of the same name, one in A Coruña and one in Granada.

== People ==
Notable people with the surname include:

- Agron journalism family

- Gershon Agron (born Agronsky; 1894–1959), American-Israeli journalist and mayor of Jerusalem

- Hassia Levy-Agron (1923–2001), Israeli dancer (daughter-in-law of Gershon)
- Martin Agronsky (born Agrons; 1915–1999), American journalist (nephew of Gershon)

- Bernie Agrons (died 2015), American politician (related to Gershon et al above)
- Charles Agron, American filmmaker
- Dianna Agron (born 1986), American actress (distantly related to Gershon et al above)
- Evsei Agron (died 1985), Russian-American mob boss
- Kimberly Agron, 2015 Miss Alaska USA
- Salvador Agron (1943–1986), Puerto Rican gang member

== See also ==
- Other surnames derived from Aaron, including:

- Aaron (surname)
- Aarons (surname)
- Baron-Cohen
- Cohen (surname)
- Goren (surname)
