= Iser =

Iser or ISER may refer to:

- iSCSI Extensions for RDMA, a computer network storage protocol
- Jizera (river) or Iser, a river in the Czech Republic
- Institute for Social and Economic Research, an institute at the University of Essex

== People with the surname ==
- Iosif Iser (1881–1958), Romanian painter and graphic artist
- Thomas Iser (born 1987), French-Luxembourgish street artist, photographer and painter
- Wolfgang Iser (1926–2007), German literary scholar

== See also ==
- Isar, a river in Germany
- Isère, a department in the Auvergne-Rhône-Alpes region in eastern France
- Isère (river), southeastern France
- Isser (disambiguation)
- Yser, a river in Belgium
