= Aron (name) =

Aron (/ˈærən/) is a masculine given name and a surname. It is an alternate spelling of Aaron, a prominent biblical figure in the Old Testament. The name Aron means "mountaineer", or "mount of strength". People with the name Aron include:

== Given name ==
Aron
- Gender: Masculine
- Language: Hebrew

Origin
- Meaning: "mountaineer", or "mount of strength".

Other names
- See also: Aaron, Aharon, Ahron

- Aron (singer), American singer
- Aron Anderson, Swedish adventurer
- Aron Atabek, Kazakh writer, poet and dissident
- Aron K. Barbey (born 1977), American neuroscientist
- Aron Baynes, Australian basketball player
- Aron Benjaminsen (born 2007), Faroese footballer
- Aron Bielski (1927–2025), Polish(-American) member of the Bielski partisans
- Aron Bjarnason, Icelandic footballer
- Aron Bogolyubov (b. 1938), Soviet Olympic medalist judoka
- Aron Burton, American blues singer and musician
- Arón Canet, Spanish motorcyclist
- Aron Cotruș (1891–1961), Romanian poet and diplomat
- Aron D'Souza, Australian businessman and founder of the Enhanced Games
- Aron Dønnum, Norwegian footballer
- Aron Eisenberg, American actor and podcaster
- Aron Ekberg, Swedish musician
- Aron Elís Þrándarson, Icelandic footballer
- Aron Erlichman
- Aron Fahrni (born 1998), Swiss para snowboarder
- Aron Flam (born 1978), Swedish comedian, podcaster, and writer, and actor
- Aron Gunnarsson, Icelandic footballer
- Aron Gurwitsch
- Aron Jóhannsson, American soccer player
- Aron Julius, English actor
- Aron Kader, American comedian
- Aron Katsenelinboigen
- Aron Kifle, Eritrean long-distance runner
- Aron Kincaid
- Aron Kiviharju, Finnish ice hockey player
- Aron Nimzowitsch
- Aron Pálmarsson, Icelandic handball player
- Arón Piper (born 1997), German-Spanish actor and singer-songwriter
- Aron Pumnul
- Aron Ra
- Aron Ralston, American mountaineer and motivational speaker
- Aron Sasu, Norwegian footballer
- Aron Sigurðarson, Icelandic footballer
- Aron Steuer (1898–1985), American lawyer and judge
- Aron Stevens, American wrestler
- Aron Strobel
- Aron Tager
- Aron Teixeira da Silva (born 1983), Brazilian footballer
- Aron Tiranul
- Aron Warner, American film producer
- Aron Winter, Dutch football manager and former player
- Aron Wright, American singer, songwriter, producer, and recording artist
- Aron Wright (September 30, 1810 — December 15, 1885), American Physician
- Aron Williams - Aviation Safety Consultant, UK

== Middle Name ==
- Bryce Aron Max Harper, Professional American baseball outfielder
- Eggert Aron Guðmundsson, Icelandic football player
- Elvis Aron Presley (sometimes written Aaron in a literary mistake), American singer and musician
- Sveinn Aron Guðjohnsen, Icelandic football player

== Surname ==
- Arthur Aron (born 1945), American psychologist
- Bill Aron, American photographer
- Elaine Aron, American psychologist
- Geraldine Aron (born 1951), Irish playwright
- Hermann Aron (1845–1913), German Jewish electrical engineer and physicist
- Jean-Paul Aron (1925–1988), French writer, philosopher and journalist
- Michael Aron (born 1959), British ambassador
- Pal Aron (born 1971), British actor
- Paul Aron (born 2004), Estonian racing driver
- Petru Aron (died 1467), Prince of Moldavia
- Pietro Aron (c.1480–after 1545), Italian music theorist and composer
- Praveen Singh Aron (born 1959), Indian politician
- Ralf Aron (born 1998), Estonian racing driver
- Raymond Aron (1905–1983), French philosopher, sociologist, journalist, and political scientist
- Robert Aron (1898–1975), French historian
- Ruthann Aron (born 1942), American former politician and convicted criminal
- Ulrich Aron (c. 1944–2025), Surinamese politician
- Wellesley Aron (1901–1988), Briton active in Palestine, then Israel

== See also ==
- Aaron, given name
- Aaron, surname
- Aarons, surname
- Arons, given name and surname
- Aaronson, surname
- Aronson, surname
- Aronsson, surname
- Arron, given name and surname
