= Arron =

Arron is both a given name and a surname. Notable people with the name include:

== Given name ==
- Arron Afflalo, American basketball player
- Arron Asham, Canadian hockey player
- Arron Crawford, Australian cricketer
- Arron Davies, Welsh footballer
- Arron Fray, English footballer
- Arron Mosby (born 1999), American football player
- Arron Oberholser, American golfer
- Arron Perry, Canadian military sniper
- Arron Sears, American football player
- Arron Yan, Taiwanese singer and actor

== Surname ==
- Bennett Arron, English comedian
- Christine Arron, French athlete
- Henck Arron, Prime Minister of Suriname

== See also ==
- Aaron (given name)
- Aaron (surname)
- Aron (name)
- Aarons (surname)
- Arons, given name and surname
- Aaronson, surname
