= List of Austin Peay Governors men's basketball head coaches =

The following is a list of Austin Peay Governors men's basketball head coaches. The Governors have had 13 coaches in their 92-season history.

Austin Peay's current head coach is Corey Gipson. He was hired in March 2023 to replace Nate James, who was fired at the end the 2022–23 season.

No.	Tenure	Coach	Years	Record	Pct.
1	1929–1930; 1933–1936	Halbert Harvill	4	30–18	.625
2	1930–1933	Scott Alden	3	24–17	.585
3	1936–1943	Fred T. Brown	7	78–52	.600
4	1945–1946	Bee Lowe	1	2–19	.095
5	1946–1962	Dave Aaron	16	258–174	.597
6	1962–1971	George Fisher	9	90–125	.419
7	1971–1977 (Note: Austin Peay vacated its appearance in the 1973 NCAA tournament, where the team finished with a 1–2 record. Kelly's original record was 189–122 (.608).); 1985–1990	Lake Kelly	11	188–120	.610
8	1977–1979	Ed Thompson	2	23–30	.434
9	1979–1983	Ron Bargatze	4	39–67	.368
10	1983–1985	Howard Jackson	2	19–35	.352
11	1990–2017 (Note: Dave Loos took a leave of absence in January 2017 to receive treatment for a cancerous lymph node. Assistant coach Jay Bowen oversaw the team in his absence, but Austin Peay credits the team's record during this period to Loos.)	Dave Loos	27	420–410	.506
12	2017–2021	Matt Figger	4	76–51	.598
13	2021–2023	Nate James	2	21–39	.350
14	2023–present	Corey Gipson	0	0–0	–
Totals		14 coaches	92 seasons	1,254–1,144	.523
Records updated through end of 2022–23 season Source
