= Aarons (surname) =

Origin
- Meaning: "Aaron's son"
- Region of origin: Hebrew

Other names
- Variant form: Aaron

Aarons is a Jewish patronymic surname, meaning "son of Aaron", the prefix Aaron meaning "lofty". It is most common amongst Jews in English language countries. It is uncommon as a given name. Notable people with the surname include:

- Al Aarons (1932–2015), American jazz trumpeter
- Anita Aarons (1912–2000), Australian-Canadian artist
- Asa Aarons (born 1956), American consumer reporter and photojournalist
- Bailey Aarons (born 1997), South African cricketer
- Bonnie Aarons, American actress and writer
- Charles L. Aarons (1872–1952), Milwaukee County Circuit Court judge
- Edward S. Aarons (1916–1975), American author
- Eric Aarons (1919–2019), member of the third of four generations of the Aarons family who played leading roles in the Communist Party of Australia (CPA)
- George Aarons (born Gregory Podubisky; 1896–1980), American sculptor
- Jules Aarons (1921–2008), American physicist and photographer
- Laurie Aarons (1917–2005), Australian Communist leader
- Leon Aarons (fl. 1960s–2020s), British pharmacist
- Leroy F. Aarons (1933–2004), American journalist, editor, author, playwright
- Mark Aarons (born 1951), Australian journalist and author
- Max Aarons (born 2000), English footballer who plays for AFC Bournemouth
- Rolando Aarons (born 1995), English footballer who plays for Slovan Liberec, on loan from Newcastle United
- Ruth Aarons (1918–1980), American table tennis player
- Sam Aarons (1895–1971), Australian radical activist and communist
- Sarah Aarons (born 1994), Australian songwriter
- Slim Aarons (1916–2006), American photographer

== See also ==
- Aaron (surname)
- Aron (name)
- Arons, given name and surname
- Arron, given name and surname
- Aaronson, surname
