= Bezalel HaKohen =

Russian rabbi (1820–1878)

Rabbi Bezalel HaKohen
- בצלאל הכהן

Personal life
- Born: January 14, 1820
- Died: April 13, 1878 (aged 58)
- Parent: Moses (father)
- Occupation: rabbi

Religious life
- Religion: Judaism

Jewish leader
- Yahrtzeit: 10 Nisan (5638)
- Residence: Vilnius

Bezalel Ben Moses HaKohen (Hebrew: בצלאל בן משה הכהן; 1820–1878) was a rabbi and Talmudist at Vilnius, then in the Russian Empire.

== Life ==
Bezalel was born at Vilnius on January 14, 1820. At the age of eighteen, he was already a competent Talmudist and felt himself qualified to criticize the Mishkenot Ya'akob (Hebrew: משכנות יעקב) of Jacob ben Aaron, one of the chief Talmudists of the time, in a letter addressed to him. In 1840, Bezalel was appointed as rabbinical assistant in Vilnius, and held the position until his death. Although the title was a subordinate one, Bezalel was in reality — at least from 1860 to 1878 — the spiritual head of the large community at Vilnius. He not only cared for this community, but answered religious questions directed to him from far and near. Consequently, many of Bezalel's answers to the questions, which were theoretical as well as practical in their bearing, are to be found in the responsa literature of the time. Equally numerous were Bezalel's contributions to the works of others, especially those printed in Vilnius. His independent work, longer than the others, is Reshit Bikkurim (Firstlings), Vilnius, 1869, responsa and treatises on Talmudic topics. The Vilna Edition Shas contains marginal glosses on many of Bezalel's treatises.

Bezalel differed from his colleagues in showing an inclination for secular sciences.

He died at Vilnius on April 13, 1878.

His brother was Shlomo HaKohen.
