= Aguon =

Aguon is a surname. Notable people with the surname include:

- Frank Aguon (born 1966), Guamanian politician
- John P. Aguon, Guamanian politician
- Katherine B. Aguon, Guamanian educator and politician.

== See also ==
- Agron (surname)
