= Arthur Aaron =

Arthur Aaron may refer to:

- Arthur Louis Aaron (1922–1943), English pilot and Victoria Cross recipient
- Arthur Aaron (footballer) (1885–1950), English football player for Stockport County

== See also ==
- Arthur Aron (born 1945), American psychologist
