= Gatherer (Bible) =

Anonymous Israelite who violated the Sabbath

According to Numbers 15:32-36, the gatherer (Hebrew מקושש, Mekoshesh), or Wood-Gatherer (Hebrew מקושש עצים, Mekoshesh Etzim) was an anonymous Israelite who violated the Sabbath by gathering wood while the Israelites were in the desert, and was brought before Moses, Aharon, and the people for judgement. As the punishment was unknown for such a case, the man was first imprisoned; then, upon God's directive to Moses, he was stoned by the people outside the camp.
