= Aharon Mor =

Polish-born Israeli civil servant (born 1947)

- אהרון מור
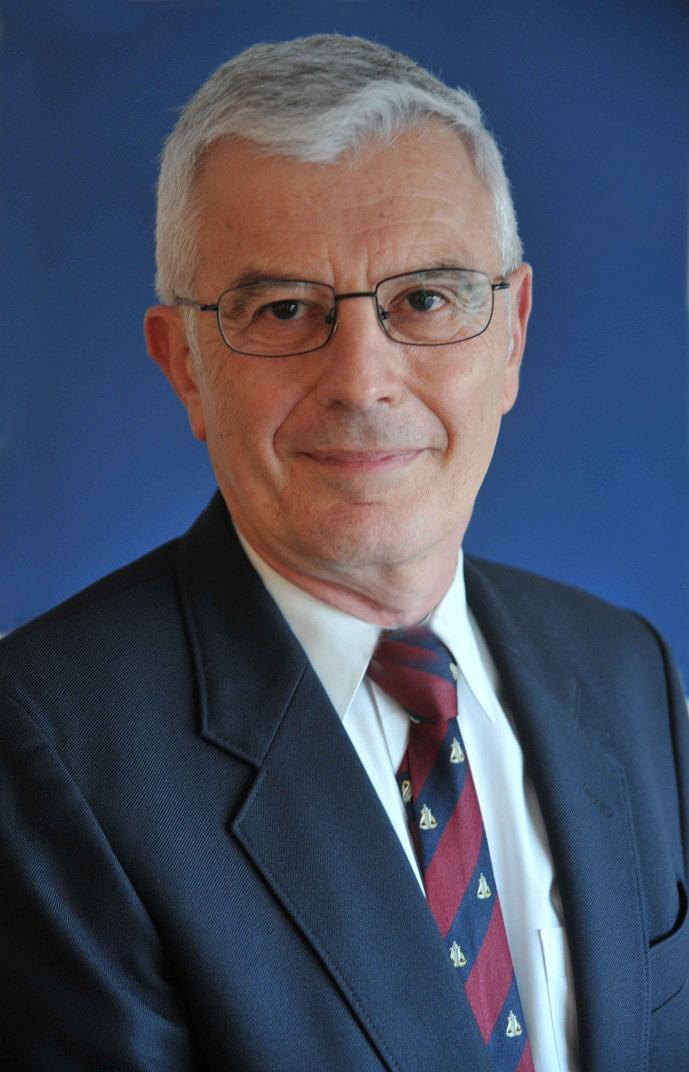
- Born: 22 August 1947 (age 79)
- Education: Hebrew University of Jerusalem

Aharon Mor (Hebrew: אהרון מור; born 22 August 1947) is a Polish-born Israeli, who as civil servant, and senior director, was head of the Restitution of Rights and Jewish Property Department at the Israeli Ministry of Pensioner Affairs, which was affiliated with the Prime Minister's Office. He has worked at the Ministry of Finance and at the Prime Minister's Office, and has represented the Jewish state abroad as an emissary in a number of international organizations.

Mor, an economist and historian, is the writer and editor of the First Global Report for Restitution of Rights and Jewish Property (1952–2004), and in 2010 was nominated by Prime Minister Benjamin Netanyahu to be a member of the National Advisory Board for Restitution Rights and Jewish Property. He was also a member of the Advisory Board of the European Shoah Legacy Institute.

== Background ==
Mor (previously Malowany) was born in 1947 in Wrocław, Poland, to parents who were both survivors of the Holocaust (Shoah). He spent his childhood in Poland and made Aliyah to Israel in 1957. He lived with his parents on a moshav, studying and working on the family farm. In 1966 he was drafted to the Israel Defense Forces and served as a soldier in the Six-Day War in 1967, as an officer in the War of Attrition in 1969, and as an officer (res.) in the Yom Kippur War in 1973. He served until 2022 as a major (res.) in the IDF Spokesperson's Unit.

Mor studied at the Hebrew University of Jerusalem, earning a B.A. in economics in 1974. He earned an M.A. in public administration and public policy in 2001 while writing two M.A. theses. The first thesis was titled "Tax Reduction for Donors of Non-Profit Organizations in Israel in Reference to Fundraising of Israeli Non-Profit Organizations". His second was titled "A Comparative Analysis of Shoah Restitution in Three European Countries since the 1990s". In 2017, he received his PhD from Tel Aviv University. His thesis dealt with the topic of Restitution of Jewish Property from the Holocaust Era, for which he was awarded a Fulbright fellowship.

In 2026, he published a book titled "Betraying the Trust: Israel, Europe and Restitution after the Holocaust."

== Government work ==
Mor began working at the Ministry of Finance in 1973 as an economist focused on collective bargaining. After serving in the budget department from 1977 to 1978, he became Supervisor of Income Tax for Investments and Foreign Investors at the Head Office of Revenue in 1978, while also serving on the board of the Investment Promotion Center. By 1988, he had advanced to associate director of the Investment Authority. From 2001 to 2008, Mor served as director at the International Affairs Department before leaving the Ministry of Finance to lead the Department for the Restitution of Rights and Jewish Property. In 2004–05, he also served as senior advisor on the restitution of rights and Jewish property at the Prime Minister’s Office and was appointed by the Israeli cabinet as co-chairman of the steering committee for restitution of Jewish rights and property.

He served as the official responsible for the restitution of Jewish rights and property within the Ministry for Social Equality, formerly the Ministry of Pensioners Affairs. Mor also acted as an envoy for the State of Israel to several international organizations. Additionally, he was a member of the National Advisory Council for the Restoration of Jewish Rights and Property and served on the Advisory Committee of the European Shoah Legacy Institute. He also prepared the “First Global Report on the Restitution of Jewish Rights and Property (1952–2004)".

== Representing Israel ==
Mor represented Israel as an emissary with three different organizations during three stints overseas: as Regional Director for the United Israel Appeal in the United Kingdom with the Joint Israel Appeal (1983–86, now the UJIA); in Canada with the Jewish Federation (1991–95); and in Australia with the Jewish National Fund (2001–02). He has also worked with organizations such as the World Jewish Restitution Organization, the Swiss Humanitarian Fund and the International Commission on Holocaust Era Insurance Claims (ICHEIC).

Mor participated in international conferences on restitution of Jewish property from the Holocaust era in Washington (1998), Vilnius (2000), and Prague (2009, 2012, 2022). and in the Prague conference process of 2010. He also participated in the process of accession of Israel to the OECD in 2008

== Other ==
Mor served as a youth counselor in his moshav during 1961-66, and as counselor and team leader for overseas students at Hebrew University during 1970-73. He also served on the boards of two community centers, one in Jerusalem and one in Mevasseret Zion.

Mor has established a number of NGOs. The first, established in 1974, helped families of the soldiers in his reserve tank brigade during wartime. The second, established in 1982, dealt with municipal issues. The third, established in 1997, dealt with programs for preventing violence at elementary schools.

In addition to his own studies, Mor is involved in the academic sector. He has lectured on economics, taxes, non-profit organizations, and the restitution of Jewish property at the University of Haifa, the College of Administration, the Israeli Center for Management, the JDC Center for Lay Leadership and the Joint Organization, the Cardinal Stefan Wyszyński University in Warsaw, the Charles University in Prague, and at conferences of the Association for Israel Studies held in Israel, New York, and Prague. Mor has published over 40 papers on topics such as Israel's accession to the OECD, the Diaspora, non-profit institutions, antisemitism and restitution of Jewish property.

Mor volunteered as chairperson of the Kvutzat Reut – Beit Israel Association, an educational NGO in Jerusalem, from 2005 to 2021, and later served as its honorary president from 2022 to 2023. He was also a member of the Board of Trustees of Braude Academic College of Engineering from 2015 to 2026 and chaired its Friends and Alumni Association from 2016 to 2018. In addition, he served on the Board of Directors of Ofek Eshkolot Company, which is affiliated with the college. Mor also founded a working group focused on strengthening Israeli philanthropy, promoted the establishment of a public council for philanthropy headed by the President of the State, and founded a working group dedicated to the restitution of Jewish property from the Holocaust era.

He is fluent in Hebrew, English and Polish and knows some French, Yiddish and Russian. He has three adult sons and lives in Tel Aviv.

Mor is a co-founder of a green startup that deals with energy conservation.
