= Isser =

Isser may refer to:

- Isser (name), a given name and surname (including a list of people with the name)
- Isser District, a district in Boumerdès Province, Algeria
  - Issers, a town and municipality in that district
  - Isser River, a river flowing through the district

== See also ==
- Iser (disambiguation)
