= Shloime =

- Gender: Male

Other names
- Related names: Shlomo

Shloime or Shloyme is a masculine given name, usually a nickname for Shlomo. Notable people with this name include:

- Shloyme Bastomski, Russian Yiddish writer and educator
- Shloime Dachs, American musician
- Shloime Gertner, British singer
- Shloyme Prizament, Galician composer and actor
- Shloime Zionce, American journalist
