= Aronsson =

Aronsson is a Swedish and Icelandic surname, and means son of Aron. Notable people with the surname include:

- Anders Aronsson (1885–?), Swedish politician
- Francisca Aronsson (born 2006), Peruvian actress and social media personality
- Ivar Aronsson (1928–2017), Swedish rower who competed in the 1956 Summer Olympics
- Jan Aronsson (1931–2016), Swedish footballer
- Kerstin-Maria Aronsson (born 1937), Swedish politician
- Lars Aronsson (born 1966), Swedish computer programmer and consultant
- Maria Aronsson, Swedish footballer
- Mats Aronsson (born 1951), former Swedish football player
- Ronja Aronsson (born 1997), Swedish footballer
