= Agron (given name) =

Agron is a masculine given name of Albanian origin. Notable people with the name include:

== History ==
Agron appears as a name in Rider's English-Latin reference dictionary of the 17th century, with the entry reading: "Agron, ita dict. quod in agris natus esset. The name of a King; also a Physitian." The Latin translates to "so-called he who was born in the countryside". Similar later works, including by Robert Ainsworth and Thomas Mortimer, focused more on the physician bearing the name (now known in English as Acron), writing how he was said to have set large fires around Athens and successfully stopped the Plague of Athens.

== Given name ==
- Agron of Illyria (died 231 BC), King of Ardiaean
- Agron of Lydia, Legendary King of Lydia
- Agron Bajrami (born 1964), Kosovar journalist
- Agron Gjekmarkaj (born 1974), Albanian politician, academic, and publicist
- Agron Haxhihyseni (born 1971), Albanian weightlifter
- Agron Limani (born 1966), Kosovar-Albanian politician and militant
- Agron Llakaj (born 1960), Albanian comedian, actor, singer, producer, and television host
- Agron Memedi (1980–2026), North Macedonian footballer
- Agron Musaraj, Albanian politician
- Agron Preteni (born 1990), Croatian kickboxer
- Agron Rama (1972–1999), Kosovar-Albanian militant
- Agron Rufati (born 1999), Croatian-Macedonian footballer
- Agron Šalja (born 1972), Slovenian football player and manager
- Agron Shehaj (born 1977), Albanian politician and entrepreneur
- Agron Sulaj (1952–1996), Albanian football player and coach
