= Aarons =

Aarons may refer to:

== People ==
- Aarons (surname), people with the surname
- Jesse Aarons, fictional character in the book Bridge to Terabithia by Katherine Paterson
- Aaron Aaronsohn, botanist (author abbreviation "Aarons.")

== Places ==
- Aarons, West Virginia, an unincorporated community
- Aarons Corner, North Carolina, an unincorporated community

== Other uses ==
- Aaron's, Inc., American lease-to-own retailer

== See also ==
- Aaron (disambiguation)
- Aron (disambiguation)
- Arons (disambiguation)
