= Ronald Rodgers =

Ronald L. Rodgers
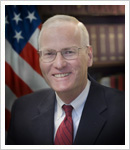
- United States Pardon Attorney
- Appointed by: April 28, 2008
- President: Barack Obama
- Vice President: Joe Biden

Personal details
- Born: Philadelphia, Pennsylvania, United States
- Education: USNA University of Dayton; School of Law; U.S. Marine Corps; Command and Staff College
- Profession: Attorney
- Awards: Legion of Merit; Meritorious Service Medal; Navy Commendation Medal (3)
- Website: Office Of The Pardon Attorney

Military service
- Allegiance: United States of America
- Branch/service: United States Marine Corps
- Years of service: 1977–1999
- Rank: Lieutenant Colonel

Ronald Rodgers was the United States Pardon Attorney. He was appointed to the position in April 2008. He was removed from office on April 22, 2014, following criticism of his handling of Clarence Aaron's petition for clemency.

== Education ==
He was a part of the U.S. Naval Academy class of 1977 where he majored in history and lettered in baseball. Upon graduation, he was commissioned a Second Lieutenant in the U.S. Marine Corps. In 1980, he was selected for the Marine Corps Funded Law Education Program and attended the University of Dayton School of Law, graduating summa cum laude in 1983.

== Early career ==
Director, Drug Intelligence Unit (September 2005 – April 2008); member, Narcotic and Dangerous Drug Section, Drug Intelligence Unit (March 1999 – September 2005); Circuit and Deputy Judge, Navy-Marine Corps Trial Judiciary (1995–1999).

== United States Pardon Attorney ==
Ronald L. Rodgers assumed duties as the Pardon Attorney in the United States Department of Justice in April 2008. The Office of the Pardon Attorney is responsible for reviewing and investigating applications to the President of the United States for executive clemency for federal criminal offenses, drafting the recommendation of the Deputy Attorney General to the President for the disposition of each clemency application, and advising Departmental leadership on matters related to executive clemency. The Pardon Attorney assists the President in the exercise of his power under Article II, Section 2, clause 1 of the Constitution (the Pardon Clause). See Executive Order dated June 16, 1893 (transferring clemency petition processing and advisory functions to the Justice Department), the Rules Governing the Processing of Petitions for Executive Clemency (codified in 28 C.F.R. §§ 1.1 et seq.), and 28 C.F.R. §§ 0.35 and 0.36 (relating to the authority of the Pardon Attorney). The Pardon Attorney, under the direction of the Deputy Attorney General, receives and reviews all petitions for executive clemency (which includes pardon after completion of sentence, commutation of sentence, remission of fine and reprieve), initiates and directs the necessary investigations, and prepares a report and recommendation for submission to the President in every case. In addition, the Office of the Pardon Attorney acts as a liaison with the public during the pendency of a clemency petition, responding to correspondence and answering inquiries about clemency cases and issues.

Rodgers left office in April 2014, and was succeeded by Deborah Leff. Following the departure of Rodgers, the Justice Department expanded eligibility for clemency, and announced a plan to canvass the federal prison population for inmates who might qualify for early release.

== Target of Justice Department Inspector General investigation ==
President Obama's pardon record during his first term in office has been described as "abysmal", with much of the fault placed on Mr. Rodgers. Mr. Rodgers was the target of a Justice Department Inspector General report in December 2012 that found that Rodgers fell "substantially short of the high standards to be expected of Department of Justice employees and of the duty he owed to the President of the United States." In particular, the report found that Rodgers misrepresented the facts to the White House of a commutation request from Clarence Aaron, a man serving a triple life sentence for facilitating a drug deal. The pardon attorney's advice to the president to deny the grant, even though the prosecutor and judge supported it, "was colored by his concern ... that the White House might grant Aaron clemency presently and his desire that this not happen," the report concluded. Mr. Aaron's case was widely reported in the public since at least 2008, and he was eventually freed by President Obama in December 2013.

== Military and other awards ==
Rodgers’ military awards include the Legion of Merit, Meritorious Service Medal, and three Navy Commendation Medals. In 2004, he received the Criminal Division award for intra-departmental cooperation, and in 2006, he received a special achievement award from the Assistant Attorney General for the Criminal Division in recognition of service as Director of the Drug Intelligence Unit.

1st Row	Legion of Merit	Meritorious Service Medal	Navy and Marine Corps Commendation Medal w/ 3 award stars

== See also ==
- Bybee memo
- Capital punishment in the United States
- Incarceration in the United States
- Justice
- Litigation
- Punishment
- Stare decisis
- United States incarceration rate
