= Aharon Gluska =

Israeli–American painter (born 1951)

Aharon Gluska אהרון גלוסקה
- Born: 1951 (age 74–75); Hadera, Israel
- Education: Académie des Beaux-Arts, Paris, France; Avni Institute of Fine Arts, Israel
- Known for: Painting
- Website: www.agluska.com

Aharon Gluska (Hebrew: אהרון גלוסקה; born 1951) is an Israeli–American painter.

== Early life ==
Gluska was born in 1951 in Hadera, Israel. He studied at the Académie des Beaux-Arts in Paris and Avni Institute of Fine Arts in Tel Aviv.

== Grants ==
Gluska received grants from the National Endowment for the Arts and the Pollock-Krasner Foundation.

== Awards ==
Gluska was one of two winners of the 1996 Zussman Prize for artists dealing with the Holocaust, from the Yad Vashem museum, for his paintings of prisoners at Auschwitz based on photographs of them taken by their Nazi guards.

== Public collections ==
Gluska's art is displayed in the following locations:

- Tel Aviv Museum of Art, Tel Aviv, Israel
- Israel Museum, Jerusalem, Israel
- Yad Vashem, Jerusalem, Israel
- Jewish Museum, New York City, New York
- Brooklyn Museum, Brooklyn, New York
- Albright–Knox Art Gallery, Buffalo, New York
- Cornell University Museum, Ithaca, New York
- Bowdoin College Museum of Art, Brunswick, Maine
- Walsh Gallery, Seton Hall University, South Orange, New Jersey
