= Clarence Aaron =

American recipient of a presidential commutation

- Born: 1968 or 1969 (age 56–57)
- Known for: Receiving a commutation from U.S. President Barack Obama
- Status: Released (sentence commuted)
- Penalty: Life imprisonment (×3)

Clarence Aaron is an American recipient of a presidential commutation, after having been originally given a triple life sentence for helping to coordinate a drug deal. President Barack Obama granted him a commutation on December 19, 2013, and he was released on April 17, 2014, after two decades in prison. The mishandling of his petition was among the reasons United States Pardon Attorney Ronald Rodgers was removed from office a short time later.
