= European Shoah Legacy Institute =

The European Shoah Legacy Institute (ESLI) was a public-benefit corporation based in Prague, in the Czech Republic whose purpose was to oversee the return of Jewish art and property seized by the Nazis during The Holocaust.

At the end of August 2017, with the assistance of the Israeli Ministry of Social Equality, the European Shoah Legacy Institute closed. A statement on their website reads, "While the work of ESLI has concluded, the Holocaust agenda continues, including above all improving the care of Holocaust survivors and other victims of Nazi persecution, deepening Holocaust education and remembrance as stated in the Terezin Declaration.

== Background ==
The European Shoah Legacy Institute was created on January 20, 2010, as a follow-up to the Terezin Declaration. The Institute was incorporated by the Ministry of Foreign Affairs of the Czech Republic. The public benefit corporation cooperated with governments and non-governmental organizations to seek solutions for the restitution of immovable property, art, Judaica and Jewish cultural assets, adequate social welfare for Holocaust survivors, and the promotion of Holocaust education, research, and remembrance. The Institute served as a vehicle or catalyst for the parties already active in this field, helping them to identify and develop best practices and guidelines of work. The sphere of action of the Institute was international, involving the European Union, other European countries, as well as countries from all around the world. The Institute also worked closely with non-European states, particularly with the United States and Israel. Aside from promoting the issue of restitution or compensation for Holocaust era assets, the Institute participated in a variety of other activities dealing with the legacy of the Holocaust in all its aspects.

Oversight of the Institute was conducted by an Administrative Board and monitored by a Supervisory Board. The Administrative Board was composed solely of Czech citizens, while the Supervisory board could include international representatives of partner organizations with the Institute. The Advisory Council consisted of international participants, typically experts in their fields, who served as the consulting body to the Director of ESLI. Members of the Honorary Board introduced and promoted the Institute on the highest levels of world politics.
