= Bill Aron =

American photographer

Bill Aron is an American photographer known as an environmental portrait photographer and a chronicler of Jewish communities around the world. Aron's photographs have been exhibited in major museums and galleries throughout the United States and Israel, including the Museum of Modern Art, the International Center for Photography, the Jewish Museum, the Chicago Art Institute, the Boston Museum of Fine Arts, the Mississippi Museum of Art, the Israel Museum in Jerusalem, and the Museum of the Diaspora in Tel-Aviv.

== Background ==
Bill Aron's first book, From the Corners of the Earth, (1986) features photographs of Jews living in the Soviet Union, Cuba, Jerusalem, New York, and Los Angeles. The book's introduction was written by Chaim Potok. In 2002, Aron published Shalom Y'All, focusing on Jews in the Deep South including, Mississippi, Louisiana, Arkansas, Alabama and South Carolina. That book featured an introduction by Alfred Uhry.

New Beginnings: The Triumphs of 120 Cancer Survivors (2015 Skyhorse Publishing) features a collection of narratives and photographic portraits of men, women, children, and families of varied ages and ethnicities who have faced and survived cancer. The book's introduction was written by Jane Brody.

== Bibliography ==
- From the Corners of the Earth, 1986, ISBN 978-1565123557
- Shalom Y'All, 2002, ISBN 978-1565123557
- New Beginnings: The Triumphs of 120 Cancer Survivors, 2015, ISBN 978-1632206640

== Exhibitions ==
- 2012 - Forever Young, Forever Old | Boston | Pucker Gallery
- 2005 - Bagels and Grits: Exploring Jewish Life in the Deep South | Maine | Bates College Multicultural Center
