= Chidinma Aaron =

Nigerian model and entrepreneur (born 1993)

- Born: Chidinma Leilani Aaron; 16 April 1993 (age 33); Kaduna, Kaduna State, Nigeria
- Occupations: Model, chef, entrepreneur
- Beauty pageant titleholder
- Title: Miss Nigeria
- Major competitions: Miss Nigeria 2018 (Winner)

Chidinma Leilani Aaron (born 16 April 1993) is a Nigerian model, entrepreneur, and former chef who was crowned the 42nd Miss Nigeria in 2018.

== Early life and education ==
Aaron was born on 16 April 1993 in Kaduna, Kaduna State, and raised in the Federal Capital Territory, Abuja, Nigeria. She is of Igbo descent from Anambra State and comes from a family of three sisters and a brother. She later relocated to Ibadan, Oyo State, to attend Lead City University, where she graduated with a Bachelor of Science degree in business administration in 2017.

Aaron began her modelling career at the age of 14, securing her first job with Teens Magazine in Abuja. Prior to her Miss Nigeria victory, she participated in several regional pageants including the Queen of Aso and the Most Beautiful Girl in Abuja competitions. Before entering the pageant, she worked as a professional chef and caterer at Yumme Meals in Abuja.

== Pageantry and advocacy ==
In November 2018, Aaron represented the South-East zone in the Miss Nigeria competition. She emerged as the winner, becoming the 42nd Miss Nigeria by prevailing over 17 other finalists at the coronation event held at the Eko Hotels and Suites in Victoria Island, Lagos.

Following her victory, Aaron has engaged in public speaking and advocacy, particularly concerning youth development, entrepreneurship, and women's empowerment. At the time of her coronation, Aaron was serving as a National Youth Service Corps (NYSC) member. Following her reign, she has expressed interest in returning to her culinary roots and launching a business in the food industry, combining her background in business administration with her passion for cooking.
