= Agron Limani =

Kosovo-Albanian politician

Agron Limani Commander
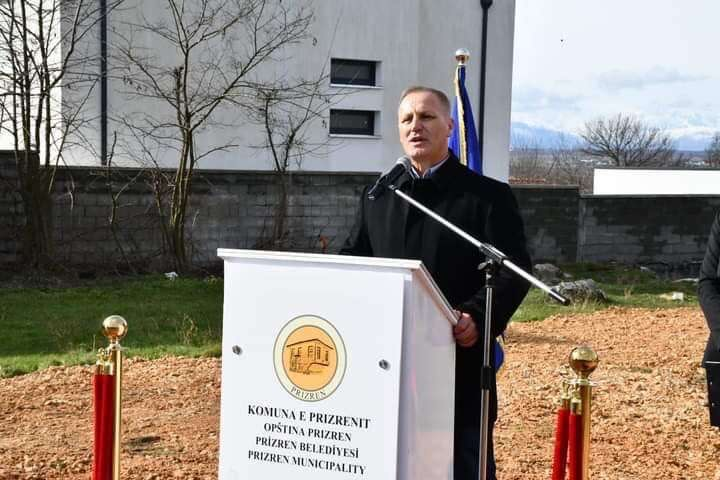

Head of the Department of Agriculture and Rural Development of Prizren
- In office 9 July 2020 – 14 November 2021
- Succeeded by: Bexhat Bytyqi

Personal details
- Born: 15 December 1966 (age 59) Krusha e Vogël, SR Serbia, SFR Yugoslavia
- Party: Vetëvendosje
- Education: University of Pristina

Military service
- Rank: Commander
- Unit: Brigada 124 "Gani Paçarrizi"
- Battles/wars: Kosovo War: Krusha massacres
- Service: Kosovo Liberation Army

Agron Limani is a Kosovo-Albanian politician and former commander of the Kosovo Liberation Army (KLA).

== Early life ==
Agron Limani was born on 15 December 1966 in Krusha e Vogël, when at the time it was part of Yugoslavia. In 1986, he was admitted to the Faculty of Engineering at the University of Pristina and finished it in 1991. From 1993 to 2005, he worked as a professor of physics in the Gymnasium "Gjon Buzuku" in Prizren. From 2005 to 2006, he also worked as an engineer at "M& Sillosi".

== Kosovo War ==
Following the outbreak of the Kosovo War, Limani was appointed as commander in the 124th Brigade of the KLA. Limani was also a victim of the Krusha massacres, and he would later appear in the Kosovo Specialist Chambers as a witness. Limani also lead the association for missing persons "March 26", who says that it is necessary for the current law to restore the former pension scheme for the families of the missing.

== Political career ==
Following the war, Limani would become an activist of the left-wing Lëvizja Vetëvendosje movement. He would be appointed Head of the Department of Agriculture and Rural Development of Prizren in July 2020. He would hold the office for just over 1 year, following the 2021 Kosovan local elections, the PDK party would win in Prizren.
