= Michele Aaron =

British film scholar and author

Academic background
- Education: Queen Mary University of London (BA); University of Southampton (MA, PhD)

Academic work
- Institutions: Brunel University of London; University of Birmingham

Michele Aaron is a British scholar whose research primarily focuses on film.

== Education ==
Aaron received a Bachelor of Arts from Queen Mary University of London, then attended the University of Southampton, from which she earned a Master of Arts in cultural and social change, followed by a Doctor of Philosophy in contemporary film and fiction.

== Career ==
Aaron began her career at Brunel University of London, then joined the University of Birmingham, where she worked from 2004 to 2017, after which she joined the University of Warwick.

Aaron has published two books and three edited collections relating to film. Her first edited collection, The Body's Perilous Pleasures, was published with Edinburgh University Press in 1999. The collection examines how the body is portrayed in contemporary film and fiction, while discussing topics related to masculinity, female desire, body piercings, queer cinema, and more. Notable films discussed in the collection include The Omen (1976), Videodrome (1983), Dead Ringers (1988), The Silence of the Lambs (1991), The Crying Game (1992), M. Butterfly (1993), Romeo is Bleeding (1993), Heavenly Creatures (1994), and Sister My Sister (1994).

Aaron's second edited collection, New Queer Cinema: A Critical Reader, was published with Edinburgh University Press in 2004. The collection is the first book-length scholarly work to explore new queer cinema, a concept coined in the 1990s to described queer-themed independent filmmaking. New Queer Cinema looks at how new queer cinema has grown and changed over time, as well as what prompted those changes. The book is separated into four sections: "New Queer Cinema in context", "New Queer Filmmaking", "Locating New Queer Cinema", and "Watching New Queer Cinema". Subjects highlighted in the book include Todd Haynes's Poison (1991), Derek Jarman's Edward II (1992), Jennie Livingston's Paris Is Burning (1990), Isaac Julien's Young Soul Rebels (1991), Gus Van Sant's My Own Private Idaho (1991), Tom Kalin's Swoon (1992), Gregg Araki's The Living End (1992), Anthony Minghella's The Talented Mr. Ripley (1999), and Kimberly Peirce's Boys Don't Cry (1999). While reviewers generally appreciated the collection, some noted that it historicizes new queer cinema as something of the past without discussing the genre's demise.

Aaron's first single-author book, Spectatorship: The Power of Looking On, was published with Wallflower Press in 2007. The book explores the concept of spectatorship and "the individual's own role in determining the meaning of a film".

Aaron's third edited collection, Envisaging Death: Visual Culture and Dying, was published with Cambridge Scholars Publishing in 2013.

Aaron published her second single-author book, Death and the Moving Image, with Edinburgh University Press in 2014. The book explores how death is portrayed in film, focusing primarily on what could be considered ordinary deaths (rather than gore). She particularly discussed the before, during, and after aspects of on-screen death, which tended to focus primarily on the living rather than the one who was dying. In 2015, the book won the Kraszna-Krausz Foundation's Best Moving Image Book Prize.

== Books ==
- Aaron, Michelle, ed. (1999). The Body's Perilous Pleasures: Dangerous Desires and Contemporary Culture. Edinburgh: Edinburgh University Press. ISBN 978-0-74860961-1.
- Aaron, Michelle, ed. (2004). New Queer Cinema: A Critical Reader. Edinburgh: Edinburgh University Press. ISBN 978-0-748-61724-1.
- Aaron, Michelle (2007). Spectatorship: The Power of Looking On. London: Wallflower. ISBN 978-1-905-67401-5.
- Aaron, Michelle, ed. (2013). Envisaging Death: Visual Culture and Dying. Newcastle Upon Tyne: Cambridge Scholars Publishing. ISBN 978-1-443-84926-5.
- Aaron, Michelle (2014). Death and the Moving Image: Ideology, Iconography, and I. Edinburgh: Edinburgh University Press. ISBN 978-0-74862443-0.
