= Kalman Aron =

Holocaust survivor and artist (1924–2018)

Kalman Aron (Latvian: Kalmans Arons, September 14, 1924 – February 24, 2018) was a Holocaust survivor and artist, primarily known for his portraits and landscapes.

A Man from Lithuania by Kalman Aron

== Early life ==
Kalman Aron was born in Riga, Latvia in 1924. His family was Jewish; since his mother was Lithuanian and his father Russian, the family spoke Yiddish at home. He had one older brother. Aron began drawing at age three, primarily pencil and crayon portraits of his family. His parents were initially discouraging, but they became more supportive when they recognized his ability to take likenesses. When he was seven, a local gallery showed his drawings, all of which sold in the first day. The resulting press caught the attention of the Latvian prime minister Kārlis Ulmanis, who was so taken with the thirteen-year-old's talent that he commissioned him to do his official portrait. Aron enrolled at Riga's Academy of Fine Arts at age 15.

== Experience during World War II ==
His father was killed during the German invasion of Latvia, but Aron, his mother, and brother survived to live in the Riga Ghetto. Eventually assigned to slave labour, he spent time at seven camps in occupied Poland, Germany and occupied Czechoslovakia throughout the course of the war. By giving soldiers and guards sketches, he obtained food and protection. After the war he received a scholarship to the Academy of Fine Arts Vienna, which awarded him his MFA.

== Life in America ==
In 1949 Aron immigrated from Vienna to Los Angeles, where he briefly worked painting ceramics and making maps. There was a school near his apartment in Silver Lake, and he started doing pastels of the students in 1951. Selling his work in galleries, he became commercially successful as a portrait painter. Notable figures who commissioned his work include Ronald Reagan, author Henry Miller, and conductor André Previn.

He had been married four times. He had one son who is also an artist.

In 2013 Susan Beilby Magee wrote a book called Into The Light: The Healing Art Of Kalman Aron, which chronicles his story and the therapeutic role of art-making in his life. She met Aron as a child when she sat for a portrait. In 2017, film producer Steven C. Barber of Vanilla Fire Films obtained the rights to make a documentary based on the book from Susan Magee. Barber brought in veteran Hollywood publicist and Oscar nomination campaign expert Edward Lozzi as an Executive Producer and publicist for the film. Lozzi was Aron's public relations consultant from 2003 until his death in 2018, and brought Steve Barber in to make the documentary. Aron died in Santa Monica, California in February 2018 at the age of 93.

== Painting career ==
His portraits are known for their psychological intensity. Critic Janice Lovoos described them thus: "His drawings reveal an unusually perceptive and sensitive man as well as a draughtsman of extraordinary talent."

An LA Times review from 1956 also commented on his skill as a draftsman.

Aron often reflected on how his experience in the Holocaust informed his work: "In the camps, I looked at and studied people. When I paint, I'm trying to capture their character, their spirit, the certain look they have. Each one has a different kind of look. There are no two people alike, even if they look alike. The Holocaust gave me an understanding of people that most people won't understand." In art circles in Europe and the United States he is known as the father of psychological realism.

In 1956, Art in America named him of the "100 Outstanding American Artists." His work has been exhibited at many museums, including the San Francisco Museum of Art, the Los Angeles County Museum, the La Jolla Art Museum, and the Denver Art Museum; and his work is in numerous private collections.
