= Jonathan Arons =

American astrophysicist (born 1943)

Jonathan Arons (born 16 August 1943) is an American astrophysicist.

Arons is a native of Philadelphia, born on 16 August 1943. He attended Williams College, and graduated in 1965. Arons completed a doctorate in astronomy at Harvard University in 1970 and split his postdoctoral research between Princeton University Observatory and the Institute for Advanced Study. He joined the University of California, Berkeley faculty in 1972, teaching within the astronomy department. From 1980, Arons was affiliated with the physics department as well. He is also a member of Berkeley's Theoretical Astrophysics Center. In 1985, he was elected a fellow of the American Physical Society "[f]or theoretical contributions in the application of plasma physics and electrodynamics to the study of pulsars, quasars, interstellar and intergalactic matter."
