= Leon Aarons =

Australian chemist/pharmacometrician

- Born: Leon Aarons
- Education: BSc Sydney (1968) MSc University of Calgary (1971) PhD University of Manchester (1973)
- Known for: pharmacometrics
- Scientific career
- Institutions: University of Manchester
- Thesis: "A Theoretical Study Of The Ionic States Observed By Photoelectron Spectroscopy" (1973)
- Doctoral advisor: Ian Hillier

Leon Aarons is an Australian chemist who researches and teaches in the areas of pharmacodynamics and pharmacokinetics. He lives in the United Kingdom and from 1976 has been a professor of pharmacometrics at the University of Manchester. In the interest of promoting the effective development of drugs, the main focus of his work is optimizing pharmacological models, the design of clinical studies, and data analysis and interpretation in the field of population pharmacokinetics. From 1985 to 2010 Aarons was an editor emeritus of the Journal of Pharmacokinetics and Pharmacodynamics and is a former executive editor of the British Journal of Clinical Pharmacology.

== Contribution to pharmacology ==
=== Data modelling ===
Much of Aarons' work focuses on building an understanding of how the effects of drugs or toxic agents are managed in humans. In 2009 he co-authored a paper that aimed to explore an approach to the modelling of effects on people by drugs and toxic agents "based on the underlying physiology and pathology of the biological processes,...[ and to review]...the current status of pharmacodynamic and pharmacokinetic modelling, and outline a conceptual framework that may be helpful in advancing the field." A model was proposed that included the kinetics of the substance as a part of the process. To some extent, this was a challenge to the widely accepted dose/effect concept in pharmacology and toxicology at the time which assumed that the exposure/dose of a drug or a toxin is related to the effects on the patient, beneficial or toxic. The paper explained the purposes of data modelling as being to describe complex data, test hypotheses and make predictions, and noted when a drug interacts with a patient, there is a "chain of events at the molecular level, cellular level, organ/physiological system level, and whole-body level...[and ]... in principle, modelling may be performed at each of these levels." The effect on a patient could be therapeutic or possibly result in adverse outcomes. The authors concluded that including the systems biology model they discussed in the paper into conventional PKPD modelling would require further collaboration to make it robust but able to be clearly defined.

=== Design of scientific investigations ===
Aarons has defined pharmacokinetics (PK) as the study of the complex chain of events that links a dose of drugs administered to a patient and the expected effect or response. PK is based on analysing the concentration of drugs and tracking how they are absorbed, distributed, metabolised and excreted within the patient. Some of his work has involved using optimal design theory to explore what makes a successful scientific investigation for pharmacokinetic studies and has said that this "involves the selection and a careful balance of a number of design factors, including the number and location of measurement times and the number of subjects to include in the study." According to Aarons, population pharmacokinetics studies which focus on what happens to the substances administered to a patient would need specific design factors that apply "statistical experimental design principles to non-linear population pharmacokinetic models." A later paper co-authored by Aarons, reviews the different approaches to optimal design of population pharmacokinetic and pharmacodynamic experiments and notes that some of the options may raise concerns at to their practicality. The paper did, however, conclude "that as the awareness about the benefits of this approach increases, more people will embrace it and ultimately will lead to more efficient population pharmacokinetic and pharmacodynamic experiments."

=== Enterohepatic circulation ===
Research by Aarons has focused on enterohepatic cycling (EHC) which refers to the process whereby a drug goes through the liver and biliary tract for excretion and is released into the small intestine, where it can be reabsorbed back into circulation and subsequently returned to the liver. This can cause liver damage and the half-life and duration of a drug to be increased. Aarons and his team stressed that knowing the extent of EHC is invaluable in deciding whether or not the in vitro characteristics of a drug - i.e. those taking place outside of a living organism - will have any effect on the overall process of absorption in vivo, or when it is taking place inside the organism. Aarons had earlier been involved in research on the area under the curve (AUC). This is a pharmacokinetic statistic used to describe the total exposure to a drug - specifically the concentration of a drug in body fluids such as blood - and is useful because it gives insight into the extent of exposure to a drug and its clearance rate from the body. The research was seen as important in the "design of sampling protocols for accurate determination of AUC(0– ∞) for drugs subject to enterohepatic cycling."

=== Drug-drug interactions ===
Drug−drug interactions (DDI) are one of the primary causes of adverse drug reactions which can result in serious health issues. In 1981, Aarons said that because of the practice at the time of multiple drug therapy, there was a good chance of drug-drug interaction. He reviewed the literature around pharmacokinetic interactions when there is a change of the disposition of the interacting drugs, in particular, the mechanisms that cause these changes. He noted that in drug-drug interactions both drugs are often affected, and it is necessary to develop "a model that describes the disposition of all interacting species." In 2011 Aaron was part of a team that critiqued the then two-fold method of assessing drug-drug interaction and proposed that there would be less bias if predictions were made using a wider range of data collected and the allowance of variability was included in the process. A research programme in 2017 that Aarons was involved in explored the mechanistic prediction of the oral bioavailability differences observed between the original formulation of a drug and that on its release. The study predicted that bioavailability of the original drug was due to reduced deactivation by an enzyme CYP3A4 in the intestine This was proven in the study, which concluded that "this work highlights the importance that formulations can have [when there are] clinically-relevant DDI involving CYP3A substrates...[and that]... this aspect is generally overlooked when evaluating DDIs in drug development." Aarons had collaborated on earlier research published in 2008 used physiologically based pharmacokinetic modelling (PBPK) to "evaluate the potential CYP3A4 inhibitory effect of a drug in development." There had been a paper that described the methodology of the trial, and the second paper analysed the results, which showed that although the drug-drug interaction was slightly less than predicted, valuable assessment of the interaction was achieved and could be applied in drug development.
