= Shlomo HaKohen (Vilna) =

Lithuanian rabbi (1828–1905)

Rabbi Shlomo HaKohen
- Title: Av Beis Din

Personal life
- Born: 1828 Vilna
- Died: 1905 (aged 76–77)
- Parent: Yisroel Moshe HaCohen
- Notable work(s): Cheshek Shlomo, Binyan Shlomo
- Known for: Editor of the Vilna Edition Shas, author of Cheshek Shlomo and Binyan Shlomo
- Occupation: Rabbi, Posek

Religious life
- Religion: Judaism

Senior posting
- Post: Av Beis Din of Vilna

Shlomo HaKohen (Hebrew: שלמה הכהן; 1828–1905) was an Av Beis Din (chief justice of a rabbinical court) and posek (decider of Jewish law) of Vilna.

He was born in 1828 to Yisroel Moshe HaCohen, a judge in the rabbinic court in Vilna.

His glosses on the Talmud were published in the Vilna Edition Shas under the name "Cheshek Shlomo" (חשק שלמה). His halachik responsa were published under the title "Binyan Shlomo" (שו"ת בנין שלמה).

HaKohen corresponded with Chaim Hezekiah Medini, who praised and quoted him in his work, Sdei Chemed.

His responsa have gained a position of prominence in halachic literature, and are frequently quoted.

He was the editor of the Vilna Edition Shas, where he pored through various manuscripts to verify and establish an accurate version of the Talmud without the mistakes so prevalent in previous editions of the Talmud. As a critical scholar, HaKohen researched the text of Ketuvim based on various writings of the Vilna Gaon.

HaCohen was allegedly an enthusiastic supporter of the Mizrachi Religious Zionism movement. However, claims that he honored Theodor Herzl by greeting him with a Torah scroll in hand and described him as the equivalent of the Jewish kings of the Biblical era are false.

HaKohen was a brother of Bezalel HaKohen and a great-grandfather of Nochum Partzovitz.
