= Irene Aronson =

German-American painter

- Born: 1918; Dresden, Germany
- Died: 1992 (aged 73–74)
- Known for: Printmaker

Irene Hilde Aronson (sometimes Anderson or Aronsohn, 1918–1992) was a German-born American painter and printmaker.

== Early life and education ==
Aronson was a native of Dresden, and came to England as a refugee in the 1930s. She studied at a number of institutions during her life, including the Eastbourne School of Art, the Ruskin School of Drawing and Fine Art, the University of Oxford, the Slade School of Fine Arts, and the University of London. In 1960 she received a bachelor's degree from Columbia University, following with a Master of Arts degree two years later. During her career she also had lessons at the Art Students League of New York and the Parsons School of Design. Her instructors included Stanley William Hayter, Vladimir Polunin, and Randolph Schwabe.

== Career ==
During her career Aronson exhibited works in solo shows both in the United States and abroad; she won numerous awards and honors for her art. Active as well as a costume designer and book illustrator, she was a member of the California Society of Etchers. In 1956 her colored, soft ground etching, L'Opera was exhibited in the Society of American Graphic Artists' (now known as the Society of American Graphic Artists) 40th Annual Exhibition at the Architectural League, New York City for $50. She lived in Rego Park and Forest Hills at various points.

== Public collections ==
Aronson's prints may be found in numerous museum collections, both in the United States and abroad. The Smithsonian American Art Museum owns two, The Circus and Spring, while the National Gallery of Art owns three, the etching Still-Life, the lithograph Zurich, and the 1958 woodcut Oriental Fantasy. Ten works are in the collection of the Metropolitan Museum of Art, including seven variants of the lithograph The Circus Performance, and copies of the etching Moonlight, the etching Danse Macabre, and a book of Chinese Fables by Kathy Ch'iu which she illustrated. The Museum of Modern Art owns a 1951 print entitled Moon Night in etching and aquatint. Four works are in the holdings of the Victoria & Albert Museum.
