= Richard E. Aaron =

American photographer (1949–2016)

- Born: April 23, 1949
- Died: December 8, 2016 (aged 67)
- Occupation: Photographer
- Known for: Music photography
- Website: richardeaaronphotography.com

Richard E. Aaron (April 23, 1949 – December 8, 2016) was a music photographer. In a career which spanned over three decades in photography and work was in feature films, television, menus, video, corporate public relations, entertainment publicity, and on album covers.

== Career ==
Aaron photographed approximately 4,000 musical artists over his career. He photographed Prince, David Bowie, Freddie Mercury, James Brown, Led Zeppelin, Bob Marley, the Sex Pistols, the Who, and members of the Beatles among many other legendary acts. Among his most notable shoots was Peter Frampton's 1976 album cover, Frampton Comes Alive! Aaron was the photographer behind Paul McCartney on Time magazine's Paul McCartney/Wings Over America cover. Aaron shot Mick Fleetwood and Fleetwood: The Visitor in Africa (RCA Records). He was awarded an honorary master's degree from Brooks Institute in 2008.

On December 8, 2016, Aaron died of kidney disease at the age of 67. Jeff Jampol, Aaron's friend, said Aaron had been battling the disease for several years. Jampol has managed The Doors, Janis Joplin, Rick James, Otis Redding, The Mamas & the Papas, Jefferson Airplane, Jefferson Starship, the Ramones, and Muddy Waters among other artists with his Jam Inc. company.
