= Hubert Aaronson =

American materials scientist

- Born: July 10, 1924; New York City
- Died: December 13, 2005 (aged 81)
- Education: Carnegie Institute of Technology

Hubert Aaronson (July 10, 1924 – December 13, 2005) was an R.F. Mehl University Professor at Carnegie Mellon University.

== Biography ==
Hubert I. Aaronson was born on July 10, 1924, in New York City. In 1936, Aaronson moved to New Jersey and graduated high school. He graduated Carnegie Institute of Technology (CIT) which is currently known as Carnegie Mellon University, majoring in engineering.

Aaronson went to the U.S. Army Air Corps and went on to fly many B-17 missions during World War II.

== Career ==
Aaronson received a B.S. in 1948, M.S. in 1954, and a Ph.D. in 1954 at the Carnegie Institute of Technology for metallurgical engineering. He served on many committees of The Minerals, Metals & Materials Society (TMS) and ASM International (ASM) as a member and a chair such as the Phase Transformations Committee. Aaronson received an honorary membership of the Japan Institute of Metals in 1996, and was then elected for the National Academy of Engineering in 1997.

Aaronson continued working as a R.F. Mehl Professor Emeritus at the Carnegie Mellon University before his death on December 13, 2005, after a lengthy illness.

== Awards ==
Aaronson received honors and awards such as the TMS C. H. Mathewson Gold Medal, TMS Educator Award, TMS Institute of Metals Lecture, R. F. Mehl Medal, and TMS Fellow.

== Works ==
Aaronson has published more than 300 scientific papers for teaching and supporting his young colleagues, and has organized conferences that influenced with the field. His well-known major contributions are about diffusional nucleation and growth, and the mechanisms of phase transformations.
