= Abe Aaron =

Canadian jazz clarinetist and saxophonist (1910–1970)

- Born: Alvin Aaron; January 27, 1910; Toronto, Canada
- Died: January 31, 1970 (aged 60)
- Genres: Jazz
- Occupation: Musician
- Instruments: Clarinet, saxophone

Alvin "Abe" Aaron (January 27, 1910 – January 31, 1970) was a jazz clarinetist and saxophonist, who was born in Canada but spent most of his life performing in the United States.

Aaron was born in Toronto on January 27, 1910. His father was bandleader with a theater band in Milwaukee, Wisconsin, and had him play reeds in the band for more than ten years. Early in the 1940s he left this group to play alto saxophone in the big band of Jack Teagarden, with which he recorded in 1942. He moved to Hollywood in 1943 and played with Horace Heidt on radio. From 1945 to 1947 he played with Skinnay Ennis, then returned to work under Heidt through 1949.

Through the decade of the 1950s Aaron played in Les Brown's Band of Renown, including on tours of Europe and East Asia. He recorded often as a member of Brown's band for Coral Records and Capitol Records. In the band, he played clarinet and alto sax in the early 1950s, then switched to tenor and baritone. He also recorded on bass clarinet with Billy Usselton.
