= Billye Aaron =

American television host (born 1936)

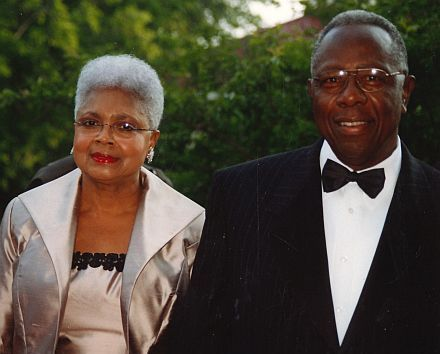
- Hank and Billye Aaron in 2002
- Born: Billye Jewel Suber; October 16, 1936 (age 89); Anderson County, Texas, U.S.
- Education: Texas College (BA English.); Atlanta University (MA); University of California at Berkeley (Post-Grad)
- Notable work: Hank Aaron Chasing the Dream Foundation
- Spouses: Samuel Woodrow Williams (died 1970) Hank Aaron (m. 1973; died 2021)
- Children: 1 (5 step)

Billye Suber Aaron (née Billye Jewel Suber; born October 16, 1936), previously known as Billye Williams, is an American television host. She is notable as the first African-American woman in the southeastern United States to regularly co-host a television show, starting with her debut on "Today in Georgia", in 1968. Billye went on to host her own show, 'Billye'.

== Philanthropy ==
- Co-founder of Hank Aaron Chasing the Dream Foundation
- Founder of UNCF Masked Ball

== Personal life ==
Billye Jewel Suber was born in Anderson County, Texas on October 16, 1936, to Nathan Suber and Annie Mae Smith. Billye was first married to civil rights activist Samuel Woodrow Williams; they had one child together, Ceci. In 1973, Billye married professional baseball player, Hank Aaron in Jamaica.

== Awards ==
- 2003 - Martin Luther King Jr. “Salute to Greatness”
- 2016 - YWCA Woman of Achievement

== Legacy ==
Billye Suber Aaron Pavilion at Morehouse School of Medicine in Atlanta, Georgia.
