= Baron-Cohen =

Baron-Cohen or Baron Cohen is a Jewish surname.

== Surnamed Baron Cohen ==
- Erran Baron Cohen (born 1968), British composer and trumpet player and brother of Sacha Baron Cohen
- Sacha Baron Cohen (born 1971), Comedian and actor known for many characters including Ali G, Borat, Brüno, and "The Dictator".
- Simon Baron-Cohen (born 1958), a psychologist, and professor of developmental psychopathology, cousin of Erran and Sacha Baron Cohen
- Dan Baron Cohen (born 1957), a playwright and president of the International Drama in Education and the Arts (IDEA) World Congress; brother of Simon Baron-Cohen, cousin of Erran and Sacha Baron Cohen
- Ashley Baron-Cohen (born 1967), known professionally as "Ash" without a surname; film director and brother of Simon Baron-Cohen, cousin of Erran and Sacha Baron Cohen

== See also ==
"Baron Cohen" can also refer to people surnamed Cohen who have been made a Baron. Such people include:

- Lionel Cohen, Baron Cohen (1888–1973), a British judge and Lord Justice of Appeal made a life peer
- Henry Cohen, 1st Baron Cohen of Birkenhead (1900–1977), a British physician, doctor and lecturer for whom the hereditary barony Baron Cohen of Birkenhead was created and on whose death it became extinct
