= Israel Aaron =

American rabbi and scholar (1859–1912)

Israel Aaron (born at Lancaster, Pennsylvania November 20, 1859 – 1912) was an American rabbi and scholar. His father was a native of Hesse-Darmstadt, where he served many years in the army, holding several minor military offices. After leaving the High School Israel, Aaron entered the Hebrew Union College in Cincinnati. From 1883 to 1887, he was rabbi in Fort Wayne, Indiana, and since 1887 was a Rabbi in Buffalo, New York. He wrote on "The Relation of the Jews and Arabs to the Renaissance," and "The Megillah of Saragossa," in the "Menorah"; also translations of Franz Delitzsch's "Colors in the Talmud" and J. Stern's "Woman's Place in the Talmud."
