= Aron =

Aron may refer to:

- Aron (name), name origin, variants, people

== Fictional characters ==
- Aron (comics), from the Marvel Universe comic Aron! HyperSpace Boy!
- Aron (Pokémon), in the Pokémon franchise
- Aron Trask, from John Steinbeck's novel East of Eden
- Áron or Aaron, the brother of Moses

== Geography ==
- Aron (Loire), a river in central France
- Aron (Mayenne), a tributary of the Mayenne in northwestern France
- Aron, Mayenne, a commune in northwestern France
- Aron, India, a town and nagar panchayat (settlement transitioning from rural to urban)

== See also ==
- Aaron (disambiguation)
- Aarons (disambiguation)
- Arons (disambiguation)
- Fanum d'Aron, a Romano-Celtic temple in Aurillac, Auvergne, France
