= Aharon Zorea =

American historian (born 1969)

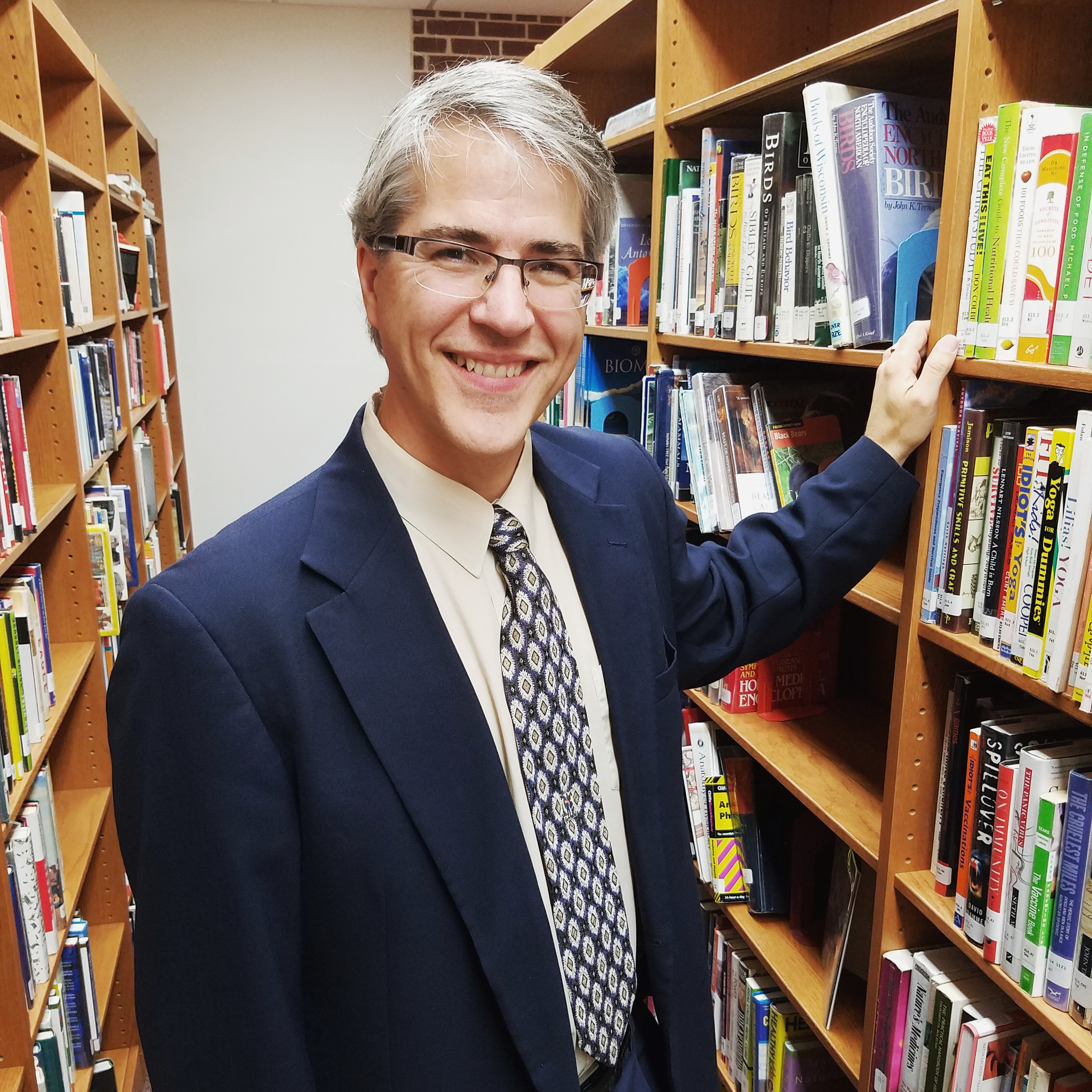
- Zorea in 2016
- Born: Aaron James Alexander Wilson; March 5, 1969 (age 57); Houston, Texas, U.S.
- Education: Bartlett High School; University of Alaska Anchorage (BA); Purdue University (MA); Saint Louis University (PhD)
- Occupation: Historian
- Spouses: Debbi Anne Sander (m. 1997; died 2014) Emily Laura Rebhan (m. 2015)
- Children: 2

Aharon Wilson Zorea (born March 5, 1969) is an American historian specializing in modern social movements, especially related to crime control and contemporary medical issues.

== Early life ==
Aharon Zorea was born Aaron James Alexander Wilson on March 5, 1969, in Houston, Texas, the youngest of three children to Barton Taylor Wilson Jr. and Patricia Anne Wilson (née Forslund). His childhood was marked by frequent travel. Before he was a year old, his family moved from Houston to Anchorage, Alaska, and at the age of five they moved to Tacoma, Washington, while his father attended law school. Five years later, they moved to Kfar Chabad, Israel and then to Chico, California, before finally settling back in Anchorage, Alaska.

== Religious conversion ==
Much of the family travel was motivated by religious conviction. Zorea's parents converted to Reform Judaism before he was born, but after ten years the entire family transitioned in Chasidic Judaism. In 1980 they legally changed the family name from Wilson to Zorea (which means, "Sower of Seeds") and then made Aliyah to Israel. They intended to immigrate and remain in the Jewish Holy Land for life. Barton changed his name to Moshe Calberg Zorea, and Patricia changed her name to Rivka Chana Zorea. His two elder brothers also changed their names, from Barton Taylor Wilson III to Avraham Barton Zorea, and from Derek Leeland Wilson to Isaac Derek Zorea. Aaron's name remained mostly the same with only a spelling change. The family moved to the village of Kfar Chabad in Israel, which is one of the two centers of Chasidism (the other being in Crown Heights, Brooklyn), where Moshe and the two elder brothers attended Yeshiva Ohr Tmimim. Shortly before Zorea's thirteenth birthday, Moshe Zorea converted to Christianity, and the entire family followed his lead. Less than a year after arriving in Israel, the Zorea family moved back to the United States and maintained the name change. The story of the family's religious conversion became the subject of many lectures and a forthcoming book.

== Education ==
After several years in Chico, California, the Zorea family moved back to Anchorage, Alaska where his parents and siblings remained. Zorea attended Bartlett High School, and graduated with a B.A. (1987) in History from the University of Alaska, Anchorage. He earned his M.A. (1993) in American Diplomatic History from Purdue University, where he studied under Jon Teaford. After teaching for five years, Zorea attended Saint Louis University and earned his Ph.D. (2005) under Donald Critchlow.

== Career ==
Between earning his M.A. and PhD., Zorea taught at several high schools including Holy Rosary Academy (Anchorage, Alaska) and Interlochen Arts Academy (Michigan). In the fall of 2004, Zorea was hired as associate professor at the Richland Campus within the University of Wisconsin Colleges. He attained the rank of full professor in 2014 after publishing his third book and serves in the History Department of the University of Wisconsin–Platteville Richland. In 2008, Zorea founded the Richland Heritage Project, which is a local institute located on the UW-Platteville Richland Campus and which specializes in digitizing and collecting local oral histories. In 2012, he was elected to the Board of Curators for the Wisconsin History Society. Zorea has written several books and more than 60 articles and chapters on presidential history and political movements, policy history, local history, and religious/intellectual history. His books include, Birth Control (Health and Medical Issues Today) (Greenwood Press, 2012), Steroids (Health and Medical Issues Today) (Greenwood Press, 2014), Finding the Fountain of Youth: The Science and Controversy Behind Extending Life and Cheating Death (Greenwood Press, 2017).

== Personal life ==
Aharon Zorea married Debbi Anne Zorea (née Sander) on July 19, 1997, while they were both teaching at Interlochen Arts Academy. They remained married for 17 years and had two children, Jacob Aharon Augustine and Jonah Charles Athanasius. Debbi was diagnosed with Stage IV Breast Cancer in 2008 and after nearly seven years, she died on July 16, 2014. Aharon later married a family friend Emily Laura Zorea (née Rebhan) on July 18, 2015.

== Bibliography ==
- The Reluctant Missionary: The Character of American Isolationism, 1775–1945 (Purdue University M.A. Dissertation, 1993)
- In the Image of God: A Christian Response to Capital Punishment (Lanham, MD: University Press of America, 2000)
- Plurality and Law: The Rise of Law Enforcement in Organized Crime Control, (Saint Louis University Ph.D. Dissertation, 2005) [soon to be re-released under new title, Between Morality and the State: The Rise of Federal Police in Organized Crime Control]
- Birth Control: Health and Medical Issues Today, (Santa Barbara, CA: Greenwood Press, 2012)
- Steroids: Health and Medical Issues Today, (Santa Barbara, CA: Greenwood Press, 2014)
- Finding the Fountain of Youth: The Science and Controversy Behind Extending Life and Cheating Death (New York: Greenwood Press, 2017)
- Marijuana: Your Questions Answered (New York: Greenwood Press, 2021)
