= Aharon of Zhitomir =

Aharon of Zhitomir was a disciple of Dov Ber of Mezeritch and a representative of the sect of the Ḥasidim: born about 1750; died about 1820. He wrote Kabbalistic homilies on the Pentateuch under the title "Toledot Aharon" (The Generations of Aaron), Berditchev, 1817.

== Biography ==
Aharon of Zhitomir wrote a book containing Kabbalistic sermons on the Pentateuch of the Torah called "Toldot Aharon", Bardichev, 1817. In the book, his sermons from Zhitomir were printed.

He died on 26 Tishrei 17 (1816). His grave was desecrated several times.
