= Aharon Galstyan =

Armenian-born Russian serial killer

- Born: Aharon Garushovich Galstyan; 1970 (age 55–56); Armenian SSR
- Other name: "The Taxi Driver Poisoner"
- Convictions: Murder x7 Robbery x26
- Penalty: Life imprisonment

Details
- Victims: 7
- Span of crimes: 2005–2008
- Country: Russia
- State: St. Petersburg
- Date apprehended: 2008

Aharon Garushovich Galstyan (Russian: Агарон Гарушович Галстян; born 1970), known as The Taxi Driver Poisoner (Russian: Таксист-отравитель), is an Armenian-born Russian serial killer and thief. Operating in St. Petersburg, he would drug his passengers with Azaleptin (sleeping medicine containing clonazepam) and rob them of their valuables, and in seven cases, his victims died, their bodies discarded near bodies of water. Despite his insistence on his innocence, Galstyan was found guilty and sentenced to life imprisonment with no chance of parole.

== Early life ==
Galstyan was born in the Armenian SSR in 1970, but it is unknown when he immigrated to Russia. After living in Moscow for a while, he moved in with a relative in St. Petersburg and began working as a private cab driver, driving a Lada Samara 2. During a visit to his doctor, he was prescribed Azaleptin, a powerful sleeping medicine that could prove fatal if ingested in large doses. Not long after, Galstyan would begin using it in his thefts.

== Crimes ==
Aharon's crimes followed the same modus operandi: upon seeing a suitable passenger, he would pick them up and drive to their desired destination. Unlike most men in his profession, he didn't bargain on prices, his only condition being that they would stop at gas stations to have a drink, to which most of his passengers agreed. After buying the drinks, which ranged from coffee to Coca-Cola, he would lace them with Azaleptin and serve the spiked brew to the victim. A few minutes after drinking it, the victims would become unconscious or fall into a complete coma. Then, Galstyan would drive off the beaten path into isolated areas, where he took all of the money, jewellery and other expensive possessions. In order to further complicate the case, he would also steal the passengers' personal IDs and throw them out of the window while driving. Most of the victims who survived were left on the roadside or near bodies of water, unable to remember what had occurred beforehand. After successfully robbing somebody, Galstyan would visit a pawnshop, where he sold the items in exchange for rubles.

When the initial crimes began in April 2005, the incidents were written off as simple one-offs and were largely ignored by police. However, within the next three years, the city's morgues saw a peculiar rise in drug-related deaths involving Azaleptin, with most of the victims being found near highway roads. Eventually, the local authorities took interest in the case, as the suspicious similarities led them to believe that a criminal was drugging and robbing citizens of their valuables in the area, and the cases were connected.

== Arrest, trial and sentence ==
The break in the case came when phone records from the final murder victim, who had called his wife before being drugged with Azaleptin, were traced back to a city gas station. The authorities examined the CCTV footage, which showed Galstyan and the passenger making a stop on the premises. After some time, they noticed that Aharon put something in the drinks he had bought, and tracked him down through his license plate. He was arrested in his St. Petersburg home, in which the officers found around 100 tablets of Azaleptin, a stun gun and a pistol. Galstyan's doctor was also questioned, and he confirmed that he had been giving his patient the tablets for the last few years, coinciding with the robberies and murders that occurred in that time period.

Due to the by now high-profile nature of the case, the trial lasted four years in total, with Galstyan categorically refusing to plead guilty to any of the charges. Despite the overwhelming evidence, including the CCTV footage, tablets found at his house and witness testimonies from survivors, he denied his guilt, threw temper tantrums on numerous occasions and forbade any videos of him being taken. In several instances, when he was approached by journalists to be interviewed, he claimed that he felt ill and had to be taken to the city hospital so they could measure his blood pressure. Paradoxically, he also claimed to have never worked as a cab driver at all but simply transported food to the stores that his relatives owned. His defence lawyers demanded that their client be acquitted, as, according to him, the media had fabricated the whole story and wanted to pin it on him because he was a foreigner who couldn't defend himself accordingly. Despite these claims, Aharon Galstyan was found guilty of seven murders and 26 robberies, and sentenced to life imprisonment with no chance of parole, which he would serve in a special regime colony. Upon hearing the verdict, he was publicly disowned by his family and relatives from the country and back home in Armenia.

=== Copycats ===
In 2016, three robberies occurred in St. Petersburg, one of which resulted in a fatality. The victim, Alexander Laptev, was a bank manager whose corpse was found in March on the Oktyabrskaya Embankment, without any outward signs of violence. A criminal case was initiated thanks to his father, a former military officer, and not longer, the perpetrators were arrested: they were four men (Nazim Hasanov, Rakhim Aliyev, Sherzat Kodirov and Nakhmad Tarverdiyev) illegally operating as taxi drivers. Like Galstyan before them, they had drugged their passengers with psychotropic drugs, robbed them of their valuables and then abandoned them near roads. For their roles in Laptev's murder, Hasanov and Aliyev received life sentences, while Kodirov and Tarverdiyev were given 12 and 9 years imprisonment, respectively, in a special regime colony.

== See also ==
- List of Russian serial killers
