= Susan Ariel Aaronson =

American academic

- Education: Binghamton University (BA); Columbia University (MIA and MA); Johns Hopkins University (MA and PhD)
- Occupations: Author; academic
- Years active: 2001–present
- Organization(s): Elliott School of International Affairs - Digital Trade and Data Governance Hub, The George Washington University
- Website: elliott.gwu.edu/susan-aaronson

Susan Ariel Aaronson is an American author, public speaker and an academic professor whose works are centered on the relationship between economic change and human rights and more recently focuses on data. She is a research professor at the Elliott School of International Affairs at George Washington University, where she set up the Digital Trade and Data Governance Hub, of which she is director.

Aaronson is senior fellow at the Centre for International Governance Innovation and was a fellow of the World Trade Institute during 2008 to 2012.

== Education ==
Aaronson received her B.A. in history from Binghamton University. She graduated from Columbia University with an M.I.A. and M.A. in Political Science and International Affairs and from Johns Hopkins University in 1993 with an M.A. and PhD in Economic and Business History.

== Writing ==
=== Books ===
- For the People, But Not by the People: A History of the International Trade Organization (ITO) (1993)
- Taking trade to the streets (University of Michigan Press, 2001)
- The Lost History of Public Efforts to Shape Globalization (2002)
- Trade Imbalance: The Struggle to Weigh Human Rights Concerns in Trade Policymaking. (2007)
- Trade and the American Dream: A Social History of Postwar Trade Policy (2015)

=== Other ===
- "Why Trade Agreements are not Setting Information Free: The Lost History and Reinvigorated Debate over Cross-Border Data Flows, Human Rights and National Security", World Trade Review, 2015, 14(4):671-700
- "Protectionism", The International Economy, Fall 2016, page 58
- Data is disruptive: How data sovereignty is challenging data governance (2021), Hinrich Foundation
- "Data Is Different, So Policymakers Should Pay Close Attention to Its Governance", in Big Data and Global Trade Law, ed. M Burri (Cambridge University Press, 2021), pp340–360.
