= Sam Aronson =

American physicist

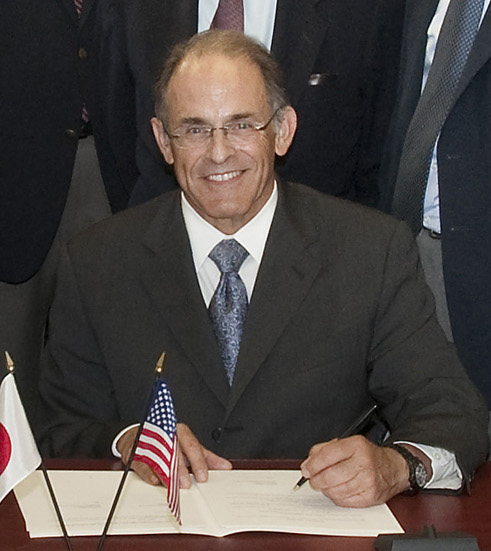
- Sam Aronson at 2012 signing of Riken-BNL agreement renewal
- Education: Columbia University; Princeton University
- Scientific career
- Fields: Nuclear physics
- Workplaces: Enrico Fermi Institute; University of Wisconsin–Madison; Brookhaven National Laboratory

Sam Aronson (May 14, 1942 – March 18, 2026) was an American physicist. He served as president of the American Physical Society in 2015 and was the director of the Brookhaven National Laboratory from 2006 to 2012.

== Biography ==
Aronson was born in Huntington, New York. He earned an A.B. in physics from Columbia University in 1964, and a Ph.D. in physics from Princeton University in 1968.

After graduation, Aronson worked at the Enrico Fermi Institute for Nuclear Studies as a research associate until 1972. He later joined the faculty of the University of Wisconsin–Madison and was on the faculty until 1977 before joining the accelerator department of the Brookhaven National Laboratory (BNL) as associate physicist. He moved to the Lab's physics department in 1982, became associate chair of the department in 1987, then deputy chair in 1988.

In 1991, Aronson became director of the PHENIX detector project, overseeing the construction of the Relativistic Heavy Ion Collider. He became director of the laboratory’s physics department in 2001. He became associate laboratory director for nuclear and particle physics in 2005 and was named director in 2006.

In 2013, Aronson became director of the RIKEN BNL Research Center. He served as vice president of the American Physical Society in 2013 and became president in 2015.

Aronson was named senior scientist emeritus of the BNL in 2017. He is the Secretary of the National Offshore Wind R&D Consortium.

Aronson was a fellow of the American Physical Society and the American Association for the Advancement of Science.
