= Shlomo Eitan =

American rabbi and linguist

Rabbi Shlomo Eitan (Hebrew: שלמה איתן) is a Hebrew language linguist who developed teaching methods for Hebrew. Eitan largely rejects the immersion method for the learning of Hebrew which is popular in most Hebrew language schools. Eitan instead focuses on teaching the structure of the languages in incremental steps. He is recognized internationally as an expert in teaching of languages.

Eitan was born in the United States and graduated from Yeshiva University. In 1979, Eitan moved to Israel where he developed his method for teaching Hebrew. Eitan has taught at many institutions including Hebrew University, Jerusalem College of Technology, Yeshivat HaKotel, and Aish HaTorah. Rabbi Eitan now teaches at Mayanot College of Jewish Studies.

In May 2012 Rabbi Eitan started "Hebrew for All" a series of web lectures targeted to beginners.

== See also ==
- Ulpan
