= Metaform =

American musician

Metaform
- Also known as: Dead Sea Stereo
- Born: Justice Aaron
- Origin: Los Angeles, California, U.S.
- Genres: Hip hop; electropop; instrumental hip hop; rock; soul
- Occupations: Musician; record producer; songwriter; engineer
- Instruments: Guitar; bass; drums; Ableton; Akai MPC; vocals; synths; drum machine
- Years active: 1999–present
- Labels: Just Records; BSMNT; Insidious Records
- Website: Official Site

Metaform (born Justice Aaron) is an American record producer, musician, and songwriter with numerous LP and EP releases. His 2008 debut album, Standing on the Shoulders of Giants, was created entirely from old vinyl samples. Justice Aaron has lived and worked in Tokyo, Japan since July 2006.

== Music ==
=== Standing on the Shoulders of Giants ===
Metaform's instrumental album, "Standing on the Shoulders of Giants," released on April 15, 2008, and gained recognition by securing a spot on the College Music Journal's top 20 for the month of May. Produced and engineered by Metaform in his various home studios over a dedicated five-year period of deep isolation, the album earned acclaim from Eddie Fleisher of Alternative Press Magazine, who listed it among the top ten records of 2008. The release garnered positive reviews in prominent publications such as URB, REMIX, XLR8R, and Alternative Press. Alternative Press described the album as "One of the best instrumental hip-hop records in years," while JIVE Magazine commented on Metaform's unique ability to take the listener on an audible journey. PopMatters Magazine also reviewed the album, highlighting Metaform's versatility as a multi-instrumentalist, allowing him to breathe new life into samples beyond typical means.

=== Beats from the Crypt: Early Works ===
Released in the same year as "Standing on the Shoulders of Giants," this LP features B-sides and rarities primarily constructed from samples. The album cover showcases an early desk work station used by the artist during late-night writing sessions. Notably, this record marks Metaform's vocal debut on tracks like "Right Next to You" and "Blue Skies".

=== The Electric Mist ===
On June 15, 2010, Metaform's release, "The Electric Mist," was an example of a departure from traditional sample/loop-based songwriting, transitioning into original synth-based song construction. The album gained visibility when it was featured on the popular torrent site Demonoid, where Justice Aaron released it for free to the public.
