= Thomas Iser =

French street artist

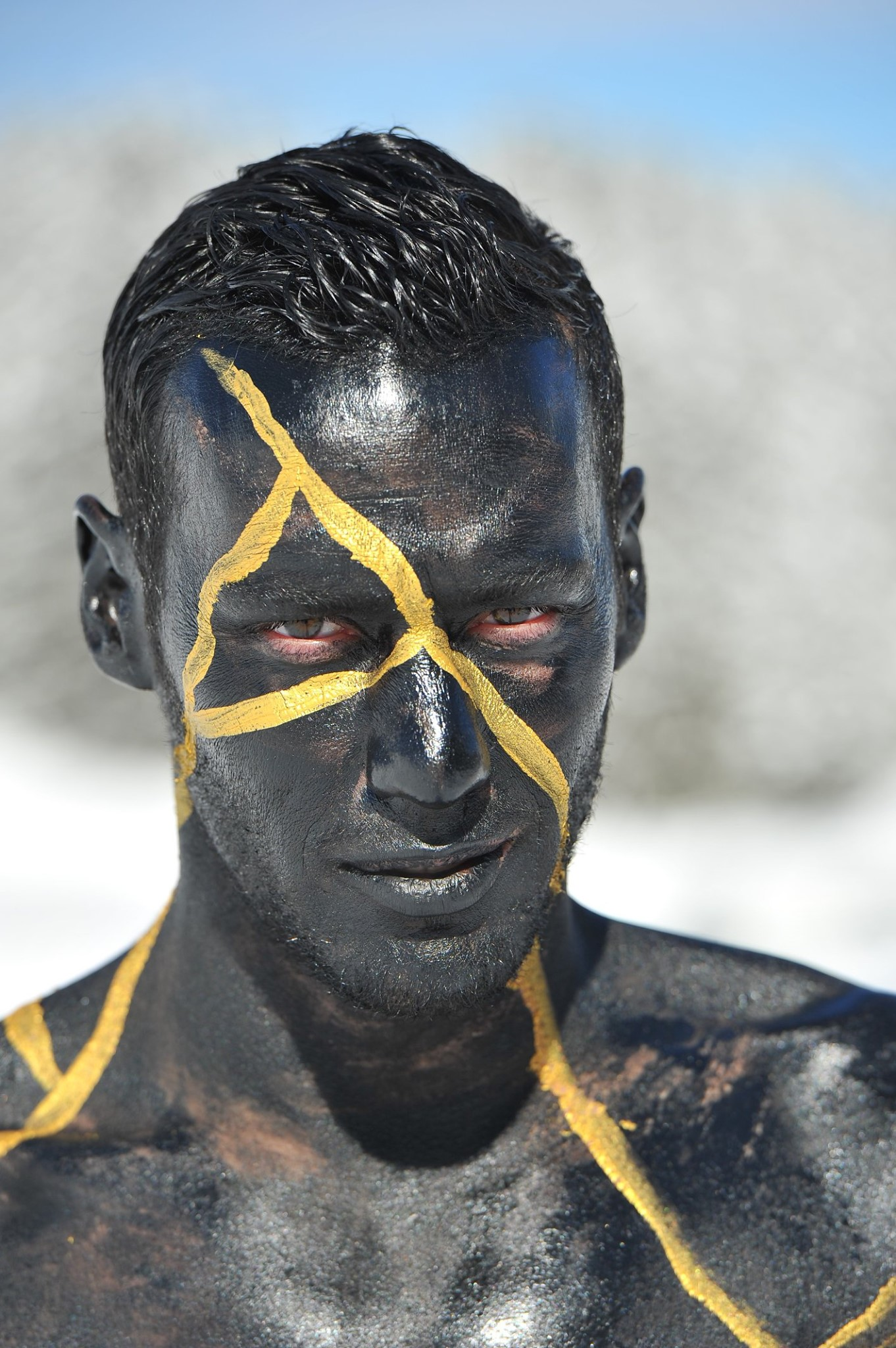
- Born: 2 September 1987 (age 39); Metz, France
- Occupations: Street artist, photographer, painter
- Known for: Painting, photography
- Movement: Kintsugi, Alchemy, Street art, Contemporary Art

Thomas Iser (born September 2, 1987, in Metz, France) is a French-Luxembourgian street artist, photographer and painter.

== Biography ==
Iser was born on September 2, 1987, in Metz to a French father and Luxembourgian mother. He started his artistic career in 2012. Using Acrylic paint and Aerosol paint, his art is inspired by graffiti art and is directly related to his personal journey. Iser is also inspired by Japanese Kintsugi art. In 2015, he launched his project "Angel Jumps". It was a collection of photographs that was taken by Iser and with drawing angel wings on the photos.

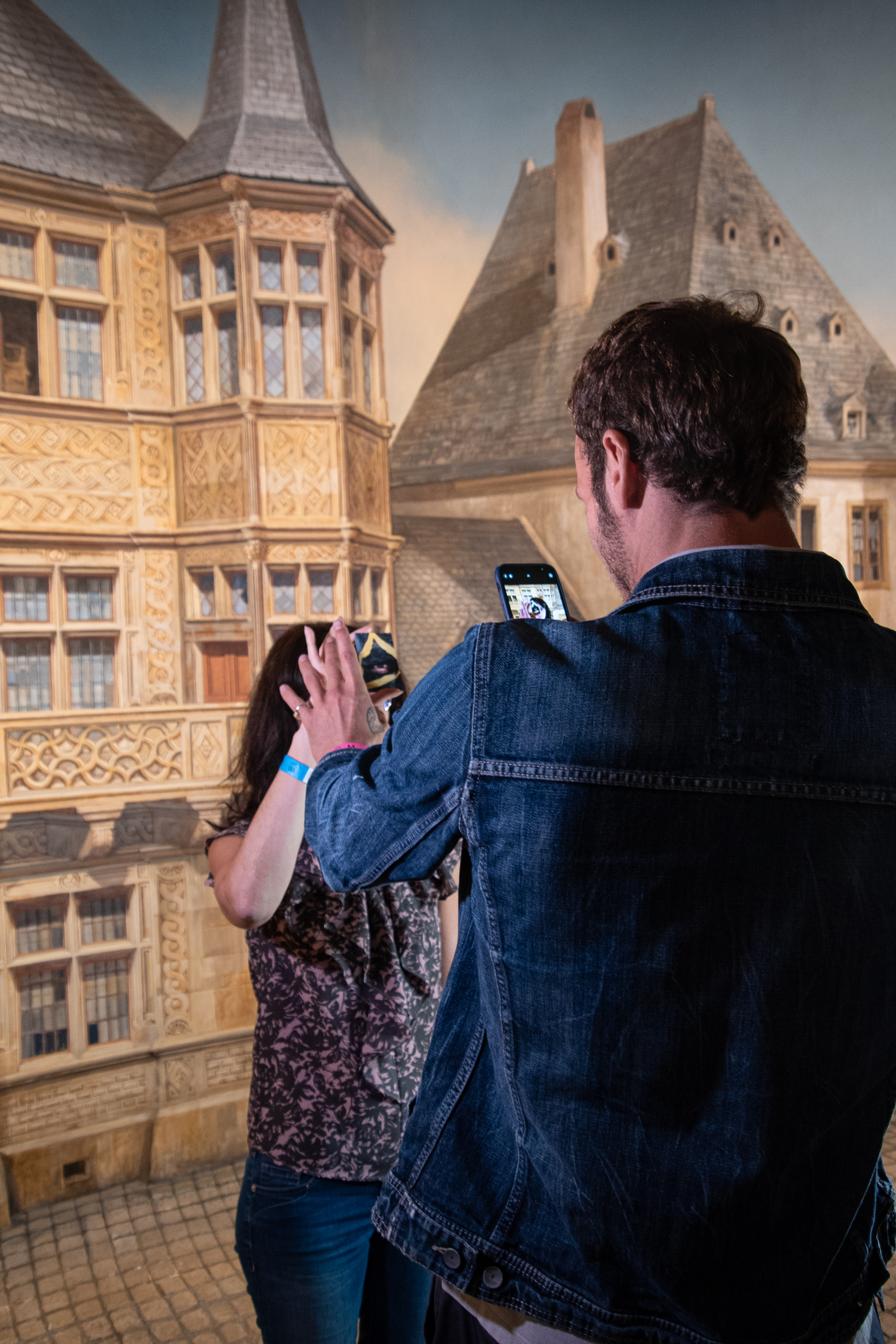
Thomas Iser taking photography during the Universal Humanity, 2021

In 2016, Iser launched his another project "Universal Humanity". Prior to taking photograph, he asked participants to hold a card in front of their right eye and talk about their dreams. His project includes a number of personalities and artists such as Pharrell Williams, Nicole Scherzinger, Bob Sinclar, Willem Dafoe, Romero Britto, Mark Seliger, David Lachapelle and Gigi Hadid, among many others.

== Exhibitions ==
- 2021: The MUD- Musée du déchet, Luxembourg Center for Circular Economy, Luxembourg
- 2021: Circular'ISER, il y a plein à voir!, Raiffeisen, Luxembourg
- 2019: Art 2 Cure, Banque Internationale à Luxembourg, Luxembourg
- 2019: The heART SHOW, Arte Fundamental Gallery, Miami, Florida, US
- 2019: Mind the Brain, University of Luxembourg, Luxembourg
- 2018: The Art Plug Power House, Marcel Katz, Miami, Florida, US
- 2018: Windows, GX Gallery, London, England
- 2017: 75 works on paper, BEERS London, London, England
- 2016: Art 2 Cure, Banque Internationale à Luxembourg, Luxembourg

== Collaborations and artistic performances ==
- 2021: Coup de cœur 2021, Nuit des musées, Luxembourg City History Museum, Luxembourg
- 2020: Collaboration avec Cathy Goedert, Luxembourg
- 2019: Stay Gold Event, Live artistic performance, Athènes
- 2019: Thomas Iser X Jitrois, Performance artistique live, Paris
