= Paul Isser =

Austrian luger

Paul Isser was an Austrian luger who competed in the mid-1950s. He won a gold medal in the men's doubles event at the 1955 European luge championships in Hahnenklee, West Germany.
