= Aarons, West Virginia =

Unincorporated community in West Virginia, United States

- Unincorporated community
- Location in West Virginia and the United States Aarons (the United States)
- Coordinates: 38°29′35″N 81°32′3″W
- Country: United States
- State: West Virginia
- County: Kanawha
- Elevation: 709 ft (216 m)
- Time zone: UTC-5 (Eastern (EST))
  - Summer (DST): UTC-4 (EDT)
- GNIS ID: 1741831

Aarons is an unincorporated community in Kanawha County, West Virginia, United States.

== History ==
A post office called Aarons was established in 1888, and remained in operation until 1916. The community was named after nearby Aarons Fork.
