= Wendy Arons =

American dramatist

- Born: 1964 (age 61–62); Birmingham, Michigan, U.S.
- Education: Yale University (BA); University of California, San Diego (MFA, MA, PhD)

Wendy Arons (born 1964) is an American dramaturg, drama professor, and critic who specializes in ecodrama and German translation. She is currently a Professor of Dramatic Literature, Area Chair of Dramaturgy, and Director of the Center for the Arts in Society at Carnegie Mellon University. She has written and edited many pieces for journals and is the author of the book "Performance and Femininity in Eighteenth-Century German Women's Writing: The Impossible Act" (2006) and co-editor, with Theresa J. May, of "Readings in Performance & Ecology" (2012).

Arons has increased artistic access in the theater world to German works: for example, she has translated Brecht's "Good Person of Szechwan" from German into English for an adaptation by Tony Kushner. She has also worked with Anne Bogart, one of the most influential artists of the 20th century.

== Life and career ==
Wendy Arons was born in Birmingham, Michigan. She attended Yale for her undergraduate degree. She then attended UC San Diego, where she earned her MFA in Dramaturgy, MA in German Literature, and PhD in Literature. Upon graduation, she worked with Anne Bogart from 1988-1989 and again in 1991. She also worked with Robert Falls on a production of "The Misanthrope" (featuring Kim Cattrall). In 1999 she joined the faculty of the University of Notre Dame as an Assistant Professor of Theater. While at Notre Dame, Arons published her book "Performance and Femininity in Eighteenth-Century German Women's Writing: The Impossible Act". After eight years of teaching at Notre Dame, she joined the faculty of the Carnegie Mellon University School of Drama in 2007 as an Associate Professor of Dramatic Literature. From 2008 to 2011, she served as the secretary of the American Society for Theatre Research. Notably, in 2012, Arons became the first person in the CMU School of Drama to win a National Endowment for the Humanities Grant. With her collaborators Sara Figal and Natalya Baldyga she published the first full translation of G.E. Lessing's "Hamburg Dramaturgy" from German to English (Routledge 2018) which is accessible online at https://mcpress.media-commons.org/hamburg/.

Today, Arons authors The Pittsburgh Tatler (https://wendyarons.wordpress.com/), a theater criticism blog, as well as working as a Professor of Dramatic Literature & Area Chair for the Dramaturgy program in the Carnegie Mellon University School of Drama, and Director of the CMU Center for the Arts in Society.

== Awards and recognition ==
Year	Award
2003	Notre Dame Boehnen Fund for the Arts Grant to attend LaMama International Directing Symposium in Bazzano Italy
2004	Maria Sybilla Merian Fellowship for archival research in Germany on 18th-century German women writers
2009	Pennsylvania Partners in the Arts Grant for "Pittsburgh Eco-Drama Festival"
2010	ASTR Domestic Exchange Grant for work on new translation of G. E. Lessing's Hamburg Dramaturgy
2012	NEH "Scholarly Editions and Translations Grant" for work on new translation of G. E. Lessing's Hamburg Dramaturgy CMU Berkman Faculty Development Grant in support of travel related to translation of G. E. Lessing’s Hamburg Dramaturgy ASTR Co-sponsored Events Award for 2012 Earth Matters on Stage Festival & Symposium at CMU, May 31-Jun 3 2012

== Publications (selected) ==
Year	Title
1988	The Prince of Homburg by Heinrich von Kleist. Translation commissioned by director Beth Schacter at the UCSD Department of Theatre. Produced at the Mandell Weiss Theatre, La Jolla CA, 1988.
1992	"Building Sentences, Ripping Out Hearts, Knocking Off Heads: An Interview with Friederike Roth," by Elizabeth Heinrichs. (Translation) The Divided Home/Land: Contemporary German Women’s Plays. Ed. Sue-Ellen Case. Ann Arbor: University of Michigan Press, 211-218.
1994	In the Jungle of Cities by Bertolt Brecht. Translation commissioned by director Walton Jones at the UCSD Department of Theatre. Produced at the Mandell Weiss Theatre, La Jolla CA, September 1994.
2006	Performance and Femininity in Eighteenth-Century German Women's Writing: The Impossible Act. New York: Palgrave/MacMillan, 2006 (261 p.).
2007	"'Laß mich sein, was ich bin:' Karoline Schulze-Kummerfeld’s Performance of a Lifetime." The German Quarterly 76.1 (Winter 2003): 68-85.
2012	"Queer Ecology/Contemporary Plays." Theater Journal 64 (December 2012): 565-582.
2012	Readings in Performance and Ecology. Wendy Arons and Theresa J. May, editors. New York: Palgrave MacMillan, 2012.
2013	“Ecodramaturgy in/and Contemporary Women’s Plays.” Co-written with Theresa May. Contemporary Women Playwrights, ed. Penny Farfan and Lesley Ferris. New York: Palgrave Macmillan, 2013. 181-196.
2014	"The Hamburg Dramaturgy in the Digital Age […]." Co-written with Natalya Baldyga. Lessing Yearbook/Jahrbuch 41 Göttingen: Wallstein, 2014: 303-306.
2017	"Sara Ruhl." Modern American Drama: Playwriting 2000-2009. Ed. Julia Listengarten and Cindy Rosenthal. London: Bloomsburty Methuen Drama, 2017. 161-184.
2017	"Lessing's Hamburg Dramaturgy in the Digital Age." Conference: "Lessings Hamburgische Dramaturgie im Kontext des europäischen Theaters." Sponsored by the Lessing-Akademie. Wolfenbüttel Germany, November 2012.
2020	“Tragedies of the Capitalocene.” Journal of Contemporary Drama in English 8.1 (May 2020): 16-33. https://doi.org/10.1515/jcde-2020-0003 Web.
2011–present	"The Pittsburgh Tatler: theatre reviews, observations on local culture, comments from fictionalized readers, ruminations on the life academic, and the occasional tidbit of juicy gossip." Web blog: http://wendyarons.wordpress.com/.
