= Anne Aaron =

Filipina engineer

- Born: Anne Margot F. Aaron
- Education: Ateneo de Manila University (BA) Stanford University (PhD)
- Occupation: Director of video algorithms at Netflix
- Awards: AT&T Asia Pacific Leadership Award

Anne Aaron is a Filipina engineer and the director of video algorithms at Netflix. Her responsibilities include "hiring and managing software engineers and research scientists, strategic decision-making on software architecture and research, project management, and cross-team coordination"

== Education ==
Aaron attended the Philippine Science High School and the Ateneo de Manila University where she received a Bachelor of Science degree in physics in 1998, and another in computer engineering the year after. She then entered Stanford University where she received a PhD in electrical engineering. During these years, Aaron received the AT&T Asia Pacific Leadership Award and C.V. Starr Southeast Asian Fellowship.

== Career ==
Before deciding to learn and get an education at Stanford, Anne Aaron got the opportunity to work an internship at Cisco Systems at just 18. From 2001 to 2007, Anne attended Stanford earning her PhD. While at Stanford, Anne conducted research that pioneered the sub-field of Distributed Video Coding. Resulting publications have been cited by hundreds of researchers in academia and industry. She designed and implemented codes for distributed compression using turbo codes. She also developed a low-complexity video encoding scheme based on distributed source coding principles. Lastly, Anne applied distributed source coding techniques to error resiliency for video broadcasting, compression for large camera arrays, and coding for random access of light fields. After graduating from Stanford, Anne decided to be a senior staff engineer for video quality for Modulus video which eventually got acquired by Motorola Inc. Anne quotes "I was one of the first employees at Dynno, an early-stage video streaming start-up, where I developed practical expertise in video streaming and peer-to-peer networking. I designed and implemented from ground up the Dyyno media processor and optimized it for a heterogeneous set of user machines." Then after leaving Modulus Video in 2009, Anne decided to work at Cisco Systems, the place she interned before college to be a senior software engineer for Flipshare Video. At Cisco, she was lead for video codec components where she designed video encoding and decoding modules for improved user experience. The software was used in millions of flip-share cameras. Then in 2011, She got hired from Netflix where she still is now. From 2011, she was a senior software engineer, in encoding technologies and now she worked her way up to be a senior director in encoding technologies. Anne Aaron can lead the team responsible for workflows, services, and research related to media encoding and processing. Anne has been at Netflix for 13 years and still going strong.

== Awards ==
Aaron was recognized as one of the 43 most powerful female engineers of 2017 by Business Insider. In 2018 she was featured among "America's Top 50 Women In Tech" by Forbes. In 2015, Anne Aaron filed a patent for predicting perceptual video quality. This helped her be an honorable recipient of the AT&T Asia Pacific Leadership Award. It is a rare award that is typically only given to a small percentage of high-performing employees who consistently demonstrate exceptional leadership performance and qualities. In 2021 Anne Aaron was recognized with many awards, including the Technology and Engineering Emmy Award for perceptual video quality metric. This award has been awarded by very few companies and is recognized for the development of open perceptual metrics for optimizing video encoding. In 2019, Anne Aaron was awarded the workflow systems medal. Established in 2012, Anne was 1 of the 10 recipients of this award. In 2018, Anne Aaron was awarded the Top Women of the Year in tech. Making a Forbes list is generally considered to be very prestigious and honorable. It signifies a high achievement level based on wealth, innovation, and overall impact. Then the year before that in 2017, she was a recipient of the 2017 Business Insider's Most Powerful Women Engineers. By Anne pitching her work to Business Insider, they were very impressed with her accomplishments and the work she does., including the Technology and Engineering Emmy Award for perceptual video quality metric. This award has been awarded by very few companies and is recognized for the development of open perceptual metrics for optimizing video encoding. In 2019, Anne Aaron was awarded the workflow systems medal. Established in 2012, Anne was 1 of the 10 recipients of this award.
