= Anders Aronsson =

Swedish politician

Anders Aronsson (12 May 1885 – 23 November 1942) was a Swedish politician. He was a member of the Centre Party, and was elected to the Swedish parliament (upper house) in 1939.
