= Arthur Aaron (footballer) =

English footballer (1885–1950)

Personal information
- Full name: Arthur Frederick Aaron
- Date of birth: 22 September 1885
- Place of birth: Liverpool, England
- Date of death: 10 April 1950 (aged 64)
- Place of death: Prescot, Lancashire
- Position: Forward

Senior career*
Years	Team	Apps	(Gls)
- Southport Central
1907	Stockport County	2	(1)
1906	St Helens Recreation		
- Accrington Stanley
- Ashton Town
- * Club domestic league appearances and goals

Arthur Frederick Aaron (21 September 1885 (Note: His baptism record gives his date of birth as 22 September, but the 1939 Register and his grave list the date as 21 September.) – 10 April 1950), later Arron, was an English association footballer who played in the Football League for Stockport County. Arthur Aaron is alphabetically the first player in Football League records.

Aaron was born in Liverpool, the son of Thomas Aaron and Mary Ann Conroy, and was baptised Romanic Catholic at Our Lady of Immaculate Conception Church. After his football career, he became an estate agent in Lancashire. He married Mary Sophia Fleetwood in 1912. In 1937, he changed the spelling of his surname to Arron via deed poll. He died in Prescot, Lancashire, aged 64.
