= Dave Aaron =

American football and basketball coach (1911–1992)

Biographical details
- Born: April 12, 1911; Nashville, Tennessee, U.S.
- Died: March 26, 1992 (aged 80); Winter Haven, Florida, U.S.
- Education: George Peabody College, Cumberland University

Coaching career (HC unless noted)

Football
- 1946–1954: Austin Peay

Basketball
- 1946–1962: Austin Peay

Administrative career (AD unless noted)
- 1946–1972: Austin Peay

Head coaching record
- Overall: 44–35–6 (football); 258–174 (basketball)

Accomplishments and honors

Championships
- Football; 2 VSAC (1948, 1953)

David Bell Aaron Jr. (April 12, 1911 – March 26, 1992) was an American football and basketball coach and college athletics administrator. He was hired in 1946 as athletic director, head football coach, and head basketball coach at Austin Peay State College—now known as Austin Peay State University. Aaron served as the head football coach at Austin Peay for nine seasons, from 1946 to 1954, compiling a record of 44–35–6. He was the head basketball coach for 16 seasons, until 1962, tallying a mark of 258–174. Aaron earned Bachelor of Science and Master of Arts degrees at Peabody College and a Bachelor of Laws degree at Cumberland University. He served in the United States Navy during World War II, assigned to the rank of lieutenant commander before his discharge.

Aaron was born on April 12, 1911, in Nashville, Tennessee. He died on March 26, 1992, at Winter Haven Hospital in Winter Haven, Florida.

== Head coaching record ==
=== Football ===
Year	Team	Overall	Conference	Standing	Bowl/playoffs
Austin Peay Governors (Independent) (1946)
1946	Austin Peay	5–4			
Austin Peay Governors (Volunteer State Athletic Conference) (1947–1954)
1947	Austin Peay	3–6–1	0–2–1	T–4th	
1948	Austin Peay	8–2	2–0	T–1st	
1949	Austin Peay	8–2	1–0	2nd	
1950	Austin Peay	5–2–1	1–2	3rd	
1951	Austin Peay	1–8–1			
1952	Austin Peay	7–2–1			
1953	Austin Peay	4–4		T–1st	
1954	Austin Peay	3–5–2			
Austin Peay:		44–35–6			
Total:		44–35–6			
