= Yossi Aharon =

Israeli musical artist

Yossi Aharon יוסי אהרון
- Born: Tiberias, Israel
- Origin: Israel
- Genres: Greek music; Rebetiko; Laïkó
- Occupation: Musician
- Instrument: Bouzouki
- Website: The Greek World}

Yossi Aharon (Hebrew: יוסי אהרון) is a musician and Greek bouzouki player from Tiberias, Israel.

== Biography ==
Yossi Aharon began his musical career at an early age. He started learning music theory at the age of 3 and learned to play the bouzouki, violin and piano. He showed talent and loved to play classical melodies of popular composers. He studied computing and successfully graduated.

== Bouzouki ==
During a visit to Greece, he started to learn to play bouzouki. He was influenced by Greek culture and developed a deep affinity for Greek music and Rebetiko. In Israel, He began teaching the instrument.

He built a new website called "The Greek world" (Hebrew: “Haolam Ha’yevani”) containing information on Greek music and culture and allowing for visitors to learn the Greek language online. The website received thousands of unique users each month. He wrote the book “Kessem Ha’bouzouki” (“The Magic of Bouzouki”), a comprehensive Greek bouzouki method book in Hebrew include Greek musical scales. More than 1000 copies of the book were sold in Israel. His great passion for Greek music and constant visits to Greece caused him to abandon his profession to spend his time in music.

In August 2012, he released the album “Melodies From The Heart”, a Greek bouzouki instrumentals album.

He created online lessons to learn Greek music and how to play the bouzouki.

== Publications ==
- The Magic of Bouzouki (2009)

== Discography ==
- Melodies From The Heart (2012)

== See also ==
- Bouzouki
- Greek music

== Sources ==
- Yossi Aharon – Biography
- Last.fm
