= Jacob ben Aaron =

Russian rabbi and author (died 1855)

Yaakov ben Aaron of Karlin Minkowski or Yankele Karliner (died 1855 (5615/5616 AM) at Karlin, government of Minsk) was a Russian rabbi and author. He was a grandson of Baruch of Shklov, the mathematician and author, and was one of the earliest and most renowned graduates of the Volozhin yeshiva. He held the office of rabbi at Karlin for about thirty years, and was considered one of the greatest rabbinical authorities of his time. His brother Yitzchok Minkowski, author of Keren Orah, succeeded him as Rabbi of Karlin for seven years after Yaakov's death.

He was the author of: (1) "Mishkenos Ya'aḳov" (Vilna, 1838), responsa on the four parts of the Shulchan Aruch; (2) "Ḳoheles Ya'aḳov" (ib. 1857), novellæ on the tractates of the Talmudic orders Zeraim and Moed; and (3) another collection of responsa. As a misnageid (anti-Chasidic) living in the very Chasidic town of Karlin, several of his responsa are rebuttals of Chasidic practices.

== Jewish Encyclopedia bibliography ==
- Fuenn, Keneset Yisrael, p. 574
