= Aharon Isser =

Israeli aeronautical engineer (1958–1995)

- אהרון איסר
- Born: 13 July 1958; Rehovoth, Israel
- Died: 9 April 1995 (aged 36)
- Education: Technion
- Known for: Airfoil modeling
- Scientific career
- Fields: Aeronautical engineering
- Workplaces: Israeli Air Force

Aharon Isser (Hebrew: אהרון איסר; July 13, 1958 – April 9, 1995) was a leading Israeli aeronautical engineer. He contributed much to the modeling of aerodynamic effects on helicopter airfoils and on the flight dynamics of missile systems. Conducting research at the Israel Institute of Technology, or the Technion, Aharon Isser published many of his papers in the Journal of the American Helicopter Society.

== Biography ==
Isser was born on July 13, 1958, in Rehovoth, Israel to Matityahu and Judith Isser, who immigrated to Israel from Europe after World War II. Born with an identical twin, Aharon and family moved to Bnei Brak in 1960. In 1976, Aharon graduated from a local high school and joined the Academic Reserve Unit of the Israeli Air Force, which allows its members to finish their academic degree prior to active duty. Deeply interested in engineering, Aharon applied to the Technion's Department of Aeronautical Engineering to begin his studies. After four years of study, Isser completed his bachelor's degree in Aeronautical Engineering in 1980 and shortly thereafter received the rank of second lieutenant in the Israeli Air Force. During his six years of service in the Israeli Air Force, Isser simultaneously earned his master's degree in Aeronautical Engineering at the Technion.

In 1984, during his military service, Isser also married, and moved to a suburb of Tel Aviv. Soon after, he and his wife had two children, one, a girl, in 1985 and the other, a boy, in 1989. In 1986 Isser was honorably discharged from the Israeli Air Force, having achieved the rank of captain. He then accepted a position as a senior engineer at Elbit Systems, a military defense contractor located near Haifa, Israel, where he modeled trajectories and flight profiles of missiles launched from a fixed-wing aircraft. While at Elbit, Isser continued his studies at the Technion on a part-time basis under the guidance of Professor Aviv Rosen. In 1995, Isser completed his Ph-D in Aeronautical Engineering and successfully defended his thesis, entitled "The Influence of Variations in the Locations of the Blades of a Hovering Helicopter on the Aerodynamic Loads Developed during Perturbations about Axial Flight".

That same year, Isser died on April 9, 1995, in a tragic accident, but his pioneering work in air foil modeling has paved the way for more aerodynamically efficient designs for helicopter rotors and other rotorcraft platforms.

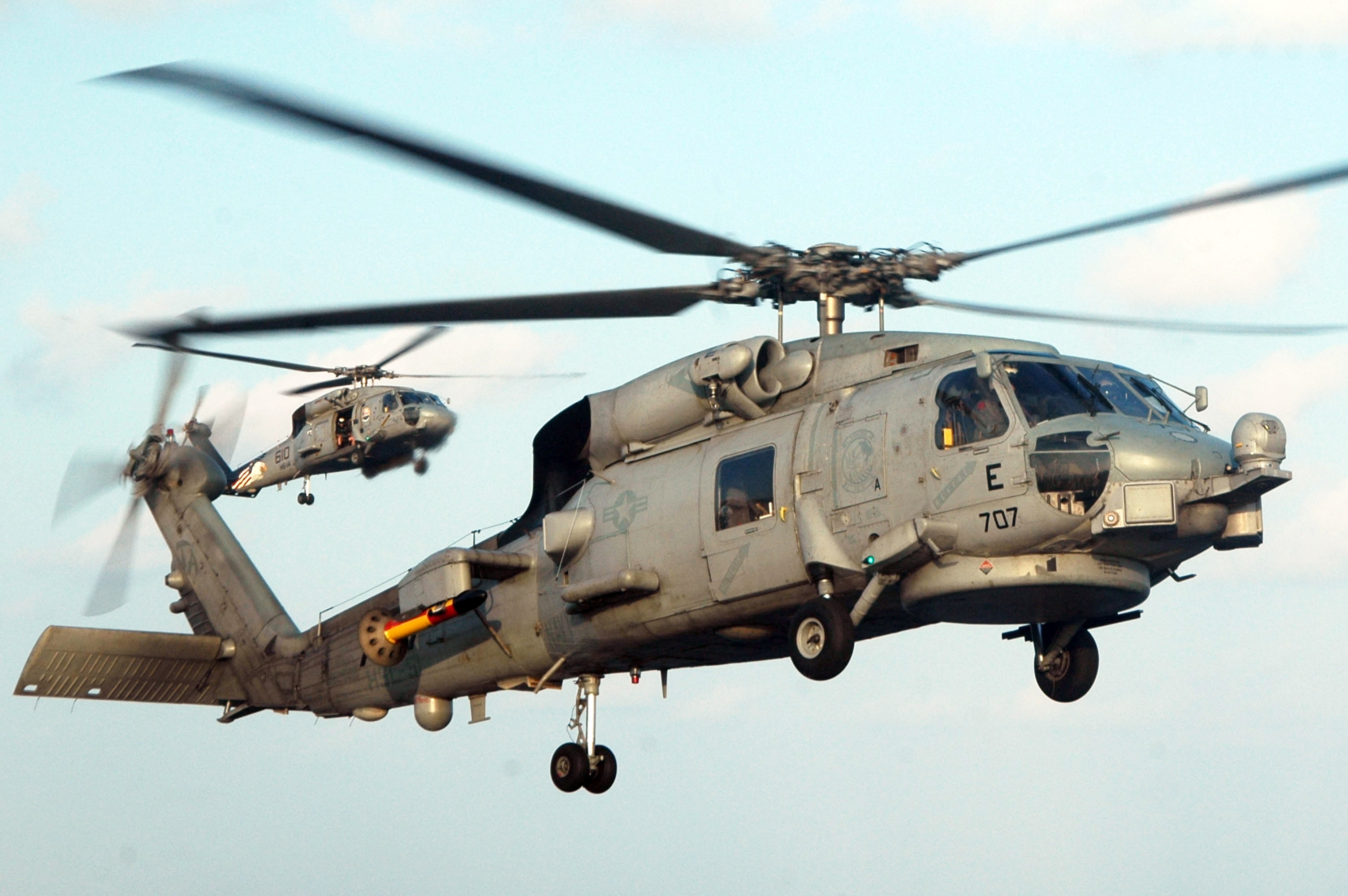
SH-60B Seahawk.

== Scientific contributions ==
Isser's research focused on modeling the non-linear airflow dynamics around rotor blades of helicopters in slow axial flight or during hovering. Isser added additional accuracy to well established models of unsteady rotor aerodynamics that had previously been developed by scientists at the Technion and at other research institutions. These basic models assumed linear distribution of air circulation along the blades and a linear wake geometry. In reality, however, small airflow velocity perturbations are caused by small vertical motions of the blades, resulting in variations in the induced wake field and airflow velocities. These airflow perturbations were not included in previous unsteady airflow models. In contrast, Isser's model added harmonic factors into the airflow model, taking into account the small periodic vertical motions of the blades during hovering or slow axial flight and treating the airflow differently in the near and far fields of the wake. To reduce the complexity of the model, Isser assumed mathematical simplifications. Then he conducted simulations of simple wake field profiles in order to test the accuracy of the model. Not only was the model validated with a high degree of accuracy for the case of constant circulation along the blades and radial trailing edges, but, thanks to Isser's updates, the model's accuracy and ability to predict rotor behavior during pitch and roll maneuvers was also significantly improved. The enhanced model predicted correctly the helicopter off-axis response, a phenomenon that was beyond the capability of previous models. The improved model could also predict more accurate designs of rotor blade profiles to better match the wake-field non-linear geometry around rotary wing platforms, improving both the flight dynamics and hovering efficiency of rotary wing platforms.
