= Shlomo Aronson =

Shlomo Aronson may refer to:

- Shlomo HaCohen Aronson (1864–1935), first Ashkhenazi rabbi of Tel Aviv, grandfather of the historian
- Shlomo Aronson (landscape architect) (1936–2018), Israeli landscape architect
- Shlomo Aronson (historian) (1936–2020), Israeli historian
