= Aaronson =

- Language: Hebrew

Origin
- Meaning: "Aaron's son"

Other names
- Variant form: Aaron

Aaronson is a Jewish patronymic surname, meaning "son of Aaron". It is unknown as a given name. Aaronson or its variants may refer to:

- Brenden Aaronson (born 2000), American soccer player
- David "Noodles" Aaronson, fictional character of the 1952 novel The Hoods by Harry Grey
- Hubert Aaronson (1924–2005), American metallurgist
- Irving Aaronson (1895–1963), American jazz pianist
- Kenny Aaronson (born 1952), American bass guitar player
- Lazarus Aaronson (1894–1966), British poet
- Marc Aaronson (1950–1987), American astronomer
- Paxten Aaronson (born 2003), American soccer player
- Ruth Aaronson Bari (1917–2005), American mathematician
- Scott Aaronson (born 1981), American computer scientist
- Stuart A. Aaronson (born 1942), American cancer biologist
- Susan Ariel Aaronson (born 1954), American author, public speaker and economist
- Trevor Aaronson, American journalist

Aaronsohn

- Aaron Aaronsohn (1876–1919), Romanian-born Palestinian Jewish agronomist, botanist, traveler, entrepreneur, and Zionist politician
- Alexander Aaronsohn (1888–1948), Romanian-born Palestinian Jewish activist and author who wrote about the plight of people living in Palestine (now Israel)
- Sarah Aaronsohn (1890–1917), Jewish spy working for the British in World War I, sister of Aaron Aaronsohn

== Fictional characters ==
- David "Noodles" Aaronson

== See also ==
- Aronson
- Aronsson
