= Callio =

Mine reuse project in Finland

Callio Pyhäsalmi
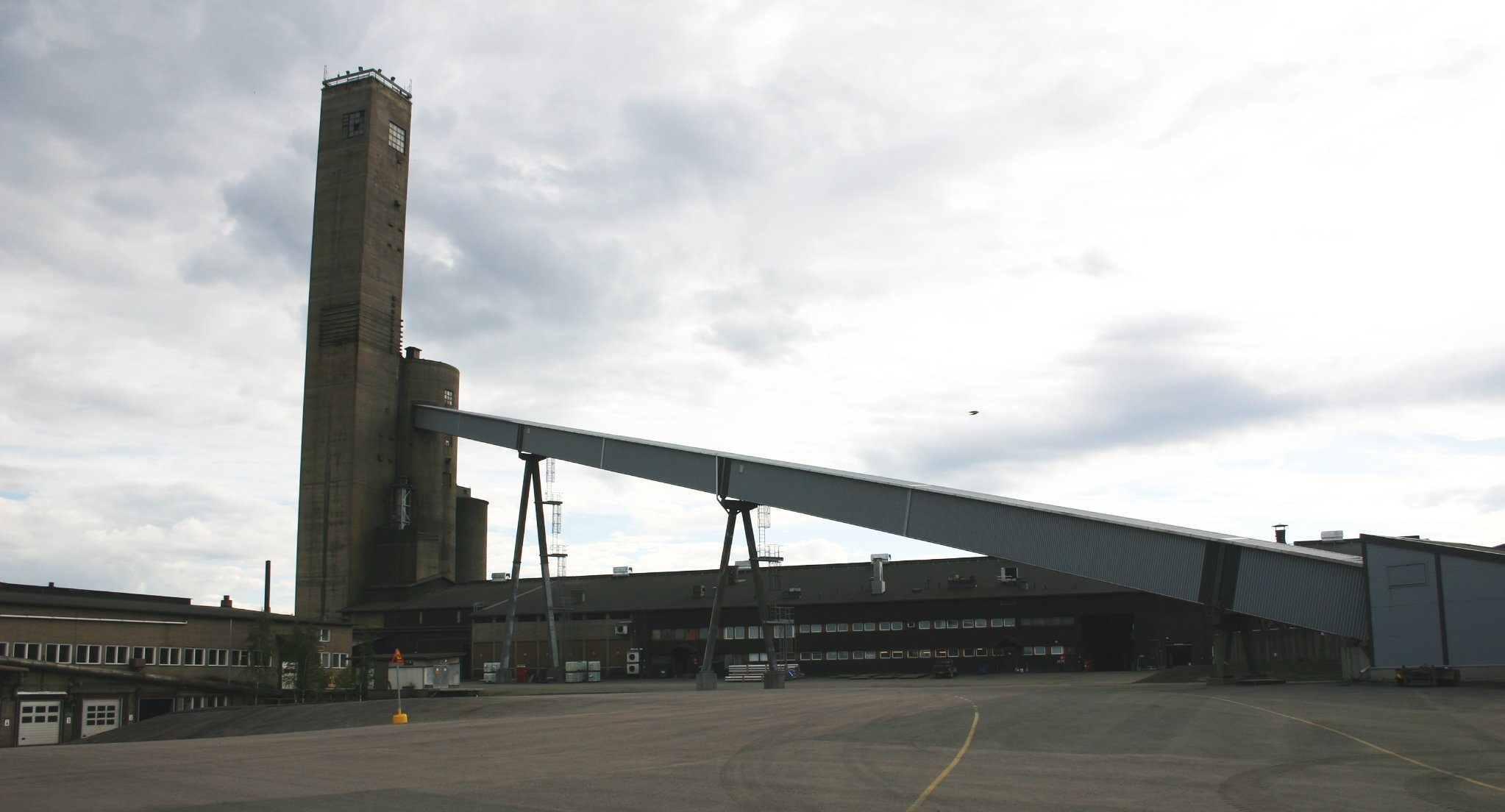
- Old tower and surrounding buildings of Pyhäsalmi mine

Project
- Developer: Town of Pyhäjärvi and University of Oulu
- Website: callio.info

Physical features
- Major buildings: Research laboratories, restaurant, sauna, energy storage facility

Location
- Reclaimed mine
- Location in Northern Ostrobothnia in Finland
- Coordinates: 63.659902°N 26.041062°E
- Country: Finland
- Region: Pohjois-Pohjanmaa
- Town: Pyhäjärvi

Callio is a project to oversee the reuse of the Pyhäsalmi Mine, located in the town of Pyhäjärvi in Finland. Callio aims to make Pyhäsalmi Mine an operating environment for businesses and an underground research facility.

Callio is a joint project by the town of Pyhäjärvi and the University of Oulu. In 2017 the facility joined the "Baltic Sea Underground Facilities and Innovation Network" (BSUIN).

The word "callio" is an anglicised version of the Finnish word "kallio" [kael-lee-oh], meaning crystalline bedrock.

== Facilities and access ==
Callio is an umbrella organization for a variety of non-mining activities in and around the mine. Of these, Callio Lab oversees scientific research and development. Proposed new activities include a secure underground data center, pumped hydroelectrical energy storage, plant and fungus growing laboratories, breeding sites for insects and fish, and several other types of underground businesses.

As of 2018, there are four environmentally controlled laboratories in Callio. Listed top-to-bottom, they are:

- Lab 1 at 75 m level (245 ft depth), occupied by the EMMA experiment;
- Lab 4 at 660 m (2165 ft);
- Lab 3 at 990 m (3250 ft);
- Lab 2 at 1430 m (4690 ft), 120 m^{2}, height ≈9 m, currently occupied by the Callio Edible Insects from Mine project.
- Numerous additional service, storage and maintenance halls exist along the access tunnel.

The ambient temperature within the mine depends on the depth but is otherwise constant. At the Lab 4 (660 m) level it is 15 °C (59 °F) and at Lab 2 (1430 m) level 28 °C (82 °F).

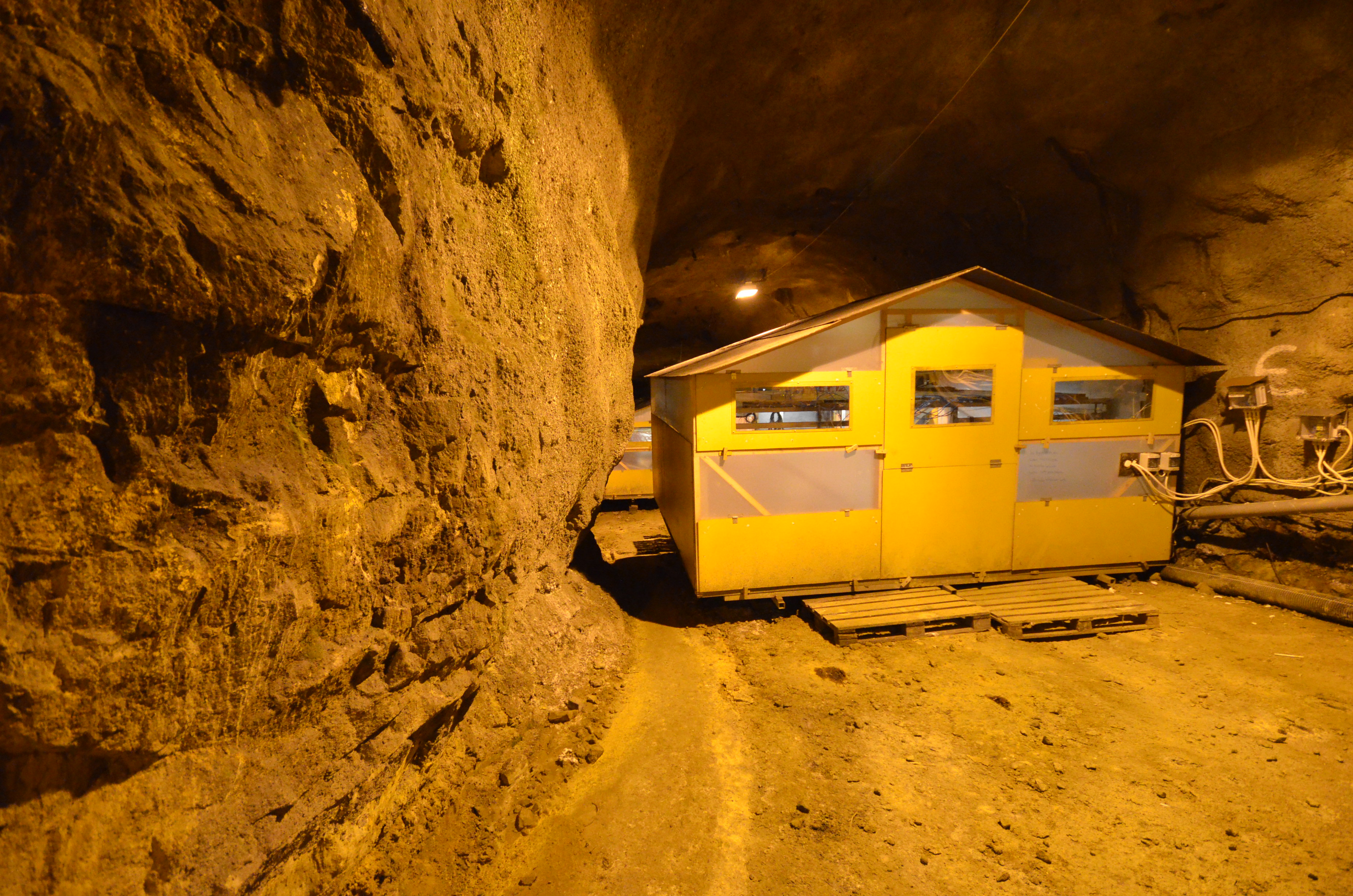
Measurement station of EMMA, one of the longest-standing experiments in the Pyhäsalmi Mine.

Currently (2018) the mine harbors two scientific experiments: C14 liquid scintillator and EMMA, operated by CUPP, University of Oulu and University of Jyväskylä.

=== Access ===
The "main level" of the mine is at 1400 meters depth, and is equipped with service and social facilities, e.g., a restaurant and the deepest sauna in the world. Accessing the main level from the surface takes just 3 minutes using the elevator (average speed 8 m/s, maximum 12 m/s). The same descent takes about 30 minutes by car, along the 11 km long decline access tunnel.

== Activities ==
Recently the mine has opened up for a variety of cultural activities. It has hosted the deepest concert in the world (by Agonizer at 1271 m ) as well as dance performances. The 11 km long spiral-shaped main tunnel has also seen several uphill running and cycling competitions.

=== Public sporting events ===
Callio Extreme Run was held 19.5.2018 with over 50 participants treading the whole 11 km from the main level at 1410 meters underground to the top via the main access tunnel. The mine tunnel network consists of hundreds of kilometers of tunnel, so for the safety of the participants all other intersections and pathways were cordoned off. Participants ranged from ultra-endurance athletes and triathletes to regular exercisers. Adding to the challenge was the environmental conditions, as the run was constant uphill, the temperature over 23 °C and humidity varying between levels of 50%-100%. Runners all had to wear safety helmets fashioned with headlights. The men's professional series was won by Tino Tiilikainen, a member of the Vuokatti SkiTeam, beating the previous record held by Sami Jauhojärvi, with a time of 1:05:56. The women's professional series was won by Maija Oravamäki with a time of 1:17:27.

Strongman Championships League Callio World Record Breakers competition was organized by Callio at Pyhäsalmi Mine on 7.9.2019. The competition was a part of the Strongman Champions League- circuit which has a total of 16 grand prix competition a year. The event was open to the public and televised as 12 strongmen from several countries participated in six events held on the mine mill grounds, as well as underground on the main level and in the open rock pit. 3 new world records were set in the farmerswalk, conan wheel, and deadlift categories by Aivars Smaukstelis, Antti Mourujärvi and Dainis Zageris.

=== Film productions ===
Callio was also facilitating the use of Pyhäsalmi Mine as a filming location for the new sci-fi television series White Wall, with a cast led by Aksel Hennie, Vera Vitali and Eero Milonoff. It is a Finnish-Swedish collaboration between Yle and SVT that was premiered in 2020 and is the most expensive Finnish television series made, with a 900 000 euro budget per episode. The mine served as one location for filming, with sets both above and below ground, where a special film set was built 660 meters underground in abandoned storage tunnels. Filming in Pyhäsalmi took place between November 2018 and April 2019 with a film crew of 50 people. Most of the extras required were locals and even miners themselves.

Other productions have also taken note of the unique location and in October 2019 the film Hiidenkirnu: Giants Kettle will film scenes at the mine. The film is produced by Markku Hakala and is set in the 1970s and is described as a mystical story about a woman, a man and a giant trapped in a barn.

=== Recognitions ===
Callio Pyhäjärvi was awarded the National Energy Globe Award Finland 2019 for its concept on pumped hydroelectrical energy. The Energy Globe Award recognizes projects oriented in conservation of energy and utilization of renewable resources in 187 participating countries. The national winners will participate and compete for the World Energy Globe Award, with the ceremony taking place 12–13 November in Espoo, Finland to mark the awards 20th jubilee. The location was chosen as Espoo, because it was elected the most sustainable city in the world by United Nations in 2018.

== Research projects ==
=== Callio Lab ===
One major project Callio pioneered is the scientifically oriented Callio Lab. Callio Lab is a multidisciplinary R&D environment aiming to utilize better the unique infrastructure and facilities of the Pyhäsalmi Mine. The underground environment has numerous possibilities for research and experimentation in fields of physics, geosciences, underground construction, microbiology, food production, and life sciences. Callio Lab aims to bring new users to the mine and facilitate the beginning of new projects. Open call is continuous and new experiments or research plans can be proposed on their website. Callio Lab's workers assist new operators in getting started, this includes providing information, safety training and transportation in the mine as well as working as a liaison between them and the mine personnel. Callio Lab is a member of the BSUIN network, which consists of underground laboratories and facilities in the Baltic region.

Callio Lab's largest underground laboratory, Lab 2, was previously the prime candidate for the LAGUNA project, which fell through due to funding issues. LAGUNA is a proposed very large volume underground neutrino observatory, designed to study e.g., the excess of matter over antimatter in the universe. Pyhäsalmi mine would have been at the optimal distance from the CERN particle accelerators, which would have provided the neutrino beams for the experiment.

=== Callio Edible Insects from Mine ===
Callio Edible Insects from Mine project is piloting underground insect production and is a two-year project beginning in December 2018. It is a joint collaboration between the following entities: city of Pyhäjärvi, Pyhäsalmi Mine Oy, Entocube Oy, Probot Oy, M-Solutions Oy, Muon Solutions Oy and Callio Pyhäjärvi. The aim is to build an ecological and efficient product plant. Principle characteristics of this type of production are remote control and -supervision and circular economy. Applications of technologies encompassing these characteristics can be found in subterranean living and space habitats. The tunnels of Pyhäsalmi Mine bear a resemblance to the conditions of pressurized lava tunnels in Mars and as such provide a good environment to test out such innovations. The project will also compare the differences in production above ground and underground. In July 2019 the first insect farm was built in lab 2 at 1430 meters underground. The first species grown there is house crickets (Acheta domesticus) and the first generation has been successfully harvested. Due to the location of the farm, heating expenses are eliminated because the geothermal energy keeps the temperature at a constant 25 degrees. The crickets produced during the project cannot be sold because of legislation, but have been made into product samples.

=== Plant Production in Mine ===
Plant Production in Mine was a project and study conducted by the Natural Resources Institute of Finland (LUKE) in Callio Lab laboratories at 660 meters underground. The goal of the project was to study how plant production can be implemented in a controlled underground environment. The experiment began with growing common hop (Humulus lupulus) in April 2018 using hydroponic technology. Fertilization, watering, air ventilation and temperature was controlled through automation and remote control. If optimal growing conditions can be characterized, this would broach the possibility of year-round production of hops with hundreds of harvests instead of just one. This could have the potential of replacing foreign imported hops for national breweries. Other plants that have been grown in the labs are potato, woad, and common nettle.

=== Intelligent Lighting ===
The Intelligent Lighting pilot study conducted at Pyhäsalmi Mine is studying the effects of artificial light in an underground working environment. The main area of study is the facilities at the main level, particularly the office spaces. The environment is naturally devoid of natural light and the lighting is constant 24/7. How this affects the workers physiologically and psychologically was studied through physiological measurements and interviews. In October 2019 the office spaces were fitted with intelligent adaptive lighting programmed to each user's individual needs. This will be followed by a study period to see whether these intelligent lighting solutions based on architectural lighting principles promote the employees well-being. The study is conducted by researchers from the University of Oulu

=== MINETRAIN ===
The MINETRAIN project is coordinated by the Oulu Mining School and aims to create a thorough training program for professionals in the mining industry. At the same time experience is gained from whether a mine heading toward closure could be transformed into a state of the art training center. The approach of the program is holistic, providing attendees with training spanning the whole life cycle of a mine. The Pyhäsalmi Mine is especially well equipped for this, because it encompasses all aspects of mining from excavation to mill processing. The program provides lectures as well as hands on learning opportunities and can be tailored to suit the participants previous experience. The project is funded by EIT Raw Materials. The first course was held in August 2019 with a class of 15 international professionals. The project leaders believe that through immersive training programs such as these, future mining operations can become more efficient and sustainable. They help the industry gain more knowledge and adopt a holistic point of view towards production and planning.

=== Energy Mine ===
The EAKR funded project Energy Mine began in February 2017 and will run until 2020. It is studying what the geothermal energy potential of Pyhäsalmi Mine is and whether it can be harnessed in a financially profitable way. The project aims to ascertain what technologies and applications could be applied in this field of study both from a scientific and economic point of view. Other supporters of this project include Pyhäsalmi Mine and the city of Pyhäjärvi.

=== Underground Rescue ===
Callio is hosting the Callio Underground Rescue- project. The Pyhäsalmi mine will be the site of Finland's first underground fire-, rescue- and safety training center. The project secured funding for 2019 through 2022 and the projected cost is 739000 euros. 70% of this came from the EAKR fund. As of now, the closest training center of this type is in Norway. The project aims to utilize the soon to be closed mine and its already existing facilities and infrastructure. The main coordinator is the city of Pyhäjärvi with numerous professional partners and businesses, that specialize in fire extinction and safety systems, ICT solutions, and tunnel- and shaft rescue operations. These partners include Pyhäsalmi Mine Oy, Agnico Eagle Finland Oy, Sotkamo Silver AB, Anglo American Sakatti Mining Oy, J&T Technology Oy, M-Solutions Oy and Posiva Oy.

=== Pumped Hydroelectric Storage Facility ===
It was announced on December 4, 2019, that Pumped Hydro Storage Sweden AB and Callio have signed a co-operation agreement to build a demo model of a pumped hydroelectric energy storage facility in the Pyhäsalmi Mine. The purpose of this co-operation is to design and develop on a smaller scale a pilot facility which can later be implemented in a full-scale version. Work is already underway, including the technical plans, timetables, and financing of the project.

This is the first phase of Callio's plans for a pumped hydroelectric storage facility in Pyhäsalmi Mine. Once the creation, testing and optimizing it this demo facility for use is completed, Callio will move to phase two. Phase two aims to negotiate the fulfillment of a full-scale 75MW facility.

== The Pyhäsalmi Mine ==
The overall depth of the Pyhäsalmi mine is 1450 m (4760 ft), making it the deepest base metal mine in Europe. Its main metals are copper and zinc.

The mine was opened in 1962 by Outokumpu, sold to Inmet mining in 2002, and obtained by First Quantum Minerals in 2013. The mine was previously planned to close by the end of 2019, but has been granted approximately 14 months more of mining activity due to an increase in demand for pyrite from Yara in Siilinjärvi. Pyrite is a by product of copper and zinc mining. As of now, mining is going to be continued until spring 2021. Above-ground refinery will continue until 2025.

The mine safety has improved significantly over the last decades, and the underground mine has become a test bed for new (often award-winning) access control, monitoring and automation technology. Underground accidents in Pyhäsalmi are very rare, and the last fatality occurred in 1995. Several easily contained on-ground refinery fires have however occurred at the site during the 2000s. In 2012, explosives contaminated with pyrite ore were sent from the Pyhäsalmi mine for destruction at the Forcit ammunition factory in Vihtavuori, where (after a year in storage) the container started to heat up and smoke. The reason for this potentially dangerous situation was revealed to be careless handling and packaging at the mine. This prompted significant changes in the safety protocols, and since 2013 all hazardous waste is destroyed on-site in Pyhäsalmi.
