= Thunderstone =

Thunderstone or Thunder Stone may refer to:

== Arts and entertainment ==
- Thunderstone (band), a Finnish power metal band
  - Thunderstone (album), their self-titled album
- Thunderstone (TV series), an Australian children's television series set on a post-apocalyptic Earth
- Thunderstone (card game), a fantasy deck-building game from Alderac Entertainment Group

== Stones ==
- Thunderstone (folklore), a worked stone object often associated with a thunder god
- Thunderstone (fossil), the fossilised rostra of a belemnoid
- The Thunder Stone, the base of the equestrian statue of Peter the Great now known as the Bronze Horseman, purportedly the largest stone ever moved by man
- The Thunder Stone, a standing stone that was part of the prehistoric Shap Stone Avenue, in Cumbria, England

== Other ==
- Thunderstone Software, a software company specializing in enterprise search

== See also ==
- Thunder Rock (disambiguation)
- Thunderegg, a nodule-like rock formed within rhyolitic volcanic ash layers
