= Dirt Metal =

Studio album by Thunderstone
- Released: September 9, 2009
- Genre: Power metal
- Label: Sony Music Finland

Thunderstone chronology
Evolution 4.0 (2007)	Dirt Metal (2009)	Apocalypse Again (2016)

Dirt Metal is Finnish power metal band Thunderstone's fifth album. It features vocalist Rick Altzi (At Vance, Masterplan) and their new keyboardist Jukka Karinen (also of the band Status Minor).

== Track listing ==
All songs written by Nino Laurenne, except where noted.

1. "Rebirth" - 0:38
2. "I Almighty" - 5:02
3. "Dirt Metal" (Titus Hjelm) - 3:58
4. "Blood That I Bleed" - 4:17
5. "Star" feat. Tomi Joutsen of Amorphis - 4:07
6. "Ghosts Of Youth" (Laurenne, Hjelm, Rick Altzi) - 5:04
7. "Counting Hours" - 4:26
8. "Dodge The Bullet" - 3:53
9. "Deadlights" (Hjelm) - 3:38
10. "At The Feet Of Fools" (Hjelm) - 4:31
11. "Suffering Song" - 8:26

== Personnel ==
- Rick Altzi - lead vocals
- Nino Laurenne - guitar, backing vocal
- Titus Hjelm - bass, backing vocal
- Mirka "Leka" Rantanen - drums
- Jukka Karinen - keyboards

== Charts ==
Chart (2009)	Peak position
Finnish albums chart	19
