= Apocalypse Again =

Studio album by Thunderstone
- Released: 23 March 2016
- Genre: Power metal
- Length: 48:26
- Label: AFM Records

Thunderstone chronology
Dirt Metal (2009)	Apocalypse Again (2016)

Professional ratings
Review scores
Source	Rating
Rock Hard	7/10
Metal Hammer Germany	4/7
Metal.de	7/10
Powermetal.de	7.5/10
Soundi	4/5 stars
Dead Rhetoric	8.5/10

Apocalypse Again is Finnish power metal band Thunderstone's sixth album. It marks the return of founding vocalist Pasi Rantanen and is also their first album with new drummer Atte Palokangas (Agonizer, Before the Dawn).

Prior to releasing the album, the band signed a publishing deal with AFM Records.

== Track listing ==
1. "Veterans of the Apocalypse" (featuring Teemu Mäntysaari on guitar) - 4:48
2. "The Path" - 4:21
3. "Fire and Ice" - 4:58
4. "Through the Pain" - 4:50
5. "Walk Away Free" - 4:07
6. "Higher" - 4:04
7. "Wounds" - 4:13
8. "Days of Our Lives" - 4:28
9. "Barren Land" - 7:47
10. "Force Sublime" (bonus track) - 4:50

== Personnel ==
- Pasi Rantanen - lead vocals
- Nino Laurenne - guitar, backing vocals
- Titus Hjelm - bass
- Atte Palokangas - drums
- Jukka Karinen - keyboards
