= Tools of Destruction =

Studio album by Thunderstone
- Released: April 18, 2005
- Recorded: 2005
- Genre: Power metal
- Length: 52:26
- Label: Nuclear Blast

Thunderstone chronology
The Burning (2004)	Tools of Destruction (2005)	Evolution 4.0 (2007)

Professional ratings
Review scores
Source	Rating
AllMusic	2.5/5 stars

Tools of Destruction is Finnish power metal band Thunderstone's third album.

== Track listing ==
1. "Tool of the Devil" (Laurenne) – 4:02
2. "Without Wings" (Laurenne, Tornack) – 4:43
3. "Liquid of the Kings" (Laurenne, Tornack) – 5:59
4. "I Will Come Again" (Laurenne) – 4:28
5. "Welcome to the Real" (Hjelm) – 6:34
6. "Last Song" (Laurenne, Tornack) – 4:19
7. "Another Time" (Laurenne) – 3:39
8. "Feed the Fire" (Hjelm) – 4:42
9. "Weight of the World" (Laurenne, Tornack) – 5:52
10. "Land of Innocence" (Laurenne, Tornack, Rantanen, Rantanen) – 8:08
11. "Rainbow in the Dark" (Dio cover) (Japanese bonus track) - 4:47
12. "Spire (Acoustic radio live version) - 4:40
13. "Spread My Wings (First demo version) - 5:33

== Charts ==
Chart (2005)	Peak position
Finnish albums chart	18

== Personnel ==
- Pasi Rantanen - lead vocals
- Nino Laurenne- guitar, backing vocal
- Titus Hjelm - bass, backing vocal
- Mirka "Leka" Rantanen - drums
- Kari Tornack - keyboards
