= Evolution 4.0 =

Studio album by Thunderstone
- Released: March 16, 2007
- Recorded: 2006
- Genre: Power metal
- Length: 47:46
- Label: Nuclear Blast

Thunderstone chronology
Tools Of Destruction (2005)	Evolution 4.0 (2007)	Dirt Metal (2009)

Professional ratings
Review scores
Source	Rating
Metal Hammer	8/10 stars

Evolution 4.0 is Finnish power metal band Thunderstone's fourth album. It features the songs "Face in the Mirror" and "Forevermore", with which the band participated in Euroviisut 2007, the Finnish national final for the Eurovision Song Contest. "Face in the Mirror" qualified for the superfinal, and got second place out of three, behind "Leave Me Alone" by Hanna Pakarinen.

== Track listing ==
All songs written by Nino Laurenne, except where noted.

1. "Evolution 4.0" – 0:13
2. "Forevermore" – 4:20
3. "Roots of Anger" – 3:43
4. "10000 Ways" – 4:16
5. "Holding on to My Pain" – 5:34
6. "Swirled" – 3:47
7. "Down With Me" – 7:16
8. "Face in the Mirror" – 3:03
9. "Solid Ground" (Titus Hjelm) – 5:40
10. "The Source" – 4:48
11. "Great Man Down" – 5:01
12. "The Riddle" (Nik Kershaw Cover) (Japanese Bonus Track) - 3:51
13. "Forevermore (Eurovision Edit)" (Limited Edition) - 3:00

== Charts ==
Chart (2007)	Peak position
Finnish albums chart	10

== Personnel ==
- Pasi Rantanen - lead vocals
- Nino Laurenne- guitar, backing vocal
- Titus Hjelm - bass, backing vocal
- Mirka "Leka" Rantanen - drums
- Kari Tornack - keyboards
