= White Wall (TV series) =

Swedish-Finnish television series

- Created by: Aleksi Salmenperä; Mikko Pöllä; Roope Lehtinen
- Directed by: Aleksi Salmenperä; Anna Zackrisson
- Starring: Aksel Hennie; Vera Vitali; Eero Milonoff
- Countries of origin: Finland; Sweden
- Original languages: Swedish; English; Finnish
- No. of seasons: 1
- No. of episodes: 8

Production
- Executive producers: Roope Lehtinen; Sonja Hermele; Alexander Tanno
- Production locations: Pyhäsalmi Mine and surroundings in Pyhäjärvi, Finland
- Running time: 45 minutes
- Production companies: Fire Monkey; Nice Drama

Original release
- Network: Sveriges Television; Yleisradio
- Release: September 20, 2020

White Wall is a Finnish-Swedish science fiction drama television series. It was co-created by Aleksi Salmenperä, Mikko Pöllä and Roope Lehtinen. The first season premiered on SVT1 in Sweden on September 20, 2020, and on YLE TV1 in Finland on November 15, 2020. It was directed by Aleksi Salmenperä (episodes 1–4) and Anna Zackrisson (episodes 5–8).

Although the story is set to occur in a fictional mining city in northern Sweden, site of the world's largest nuclear waste depository, the actual main shooting location was Pyhäsalmi Mine and its surroundings in Pyhäjärvi, Finland. White Wall is the most expensive Finnish television series so far (2019) with a budget of €7 million.
