= The Burning (Thunderstone album) =

Studio album by Thunderstone
- Released: January 12, 2004
- Recorded: 2003
- Genre: Power metal
- Length: 48:58
- Label: Nuclear Blast

Thunderstone chronology
Thunderstone (2002)	The Burning (2004)	Tools Of Destruction (2005)

Professional ratings
Review scores
Source	Rating
Allmusic	3/5 stars

The Burning is Finnish power metal band Thunderstone's second album.

== Track listing ==
All songs written by Nino Laurenne, except where noted.

1. "Until We Touch the Burning Sun" – 5:55
2. "Break the Emotion" – 4:42
3. "Mirror Never Lies" – 3:44
4. "Tin Star Man" (Titus Hjelm) – 5:10
5. "Spire" (Laurenne, Kari Tornack) – 4:37
6. "Sea of Sorrow" – 5:03
7. "Side by Side" – 4:22
8. "Drawn to the Flame" (Hjelm, Tornack) – 4:43
9. "Forth into the Black" – 4:41
10. "Evil Within" (Laurenne, Tornack) – 6:01
11. "In Sanity" (Japanese Bonus Track) - 5:52
12. "Welcome Home" (Metallica Cover) (Japanese Bonus Track) - 5:08
13. "Heart Of Steel" (Manowar Cover) (Japanese Bonus Track) - 4:56
14. "Let The Demons Free" (Demo) (Japanese Bonus Track) - 4:07
15. "Voice In A Dream" (Demo) (Japanese Bonus Track) - 4:17
16. "Me, My Enemy" (Demo) (Japanese Bonus Track) - 3:30

== Charts ==
Chart (2004)	Peak position
Finnish albums chart	13

== Personnel ==
- Pasi Rantanen - lead vocals
- Nino Laurenne- guitar, backing vocal
- Titus Hjelm - bass, backing vocal
- Mirka "Leka" Rantanen - drums
- Kari Tornack - keyboards
