= Aaron Bing =

- Origin: Jacksonville, Florida, U.S.
- Genres: American adult contemporary, smooth jazz
- Years active: 2005–present
- Labels: Century Records

Aaron Bing (born Aaron Jaye Bing), is an American adult contemporary and smooth jazz saxophonist. Bing was the artist who appeared on the Late Show with David Letterman to be recognized for his part in a Guinness World Record challenge. His feat, Holding a note for 39 minutes and 40 seconds! Although that did not beat the Kenny G record of 45 minutes, 47 seconds, it certainly goes down as a monumental accomplishment.

== Early life ==
Aaron Bing was born in Miami, Florida to an African-American mother and an Afro-Dominican father. Bing never got a chance to meet or see his father. His mother, an elementary school teacher in Miami at the time of Aaron's birth, moved to Jacksonville, Florida to live with her mother after suffering hard times in Miami. A few years after the move, Bing's mother disappeared and left him with his grandmother. At age 10, While living with his grandmother, Bing came into contact with his aunt's old wooden clarinet playing under his grandmother's bed. Confused as to what the instrument was, but interested in learning how to play, Bing took the clarinet to school with him the first day of his seventh grade year. That school year he attended Mathew W. Gilbert 7th Grade Center. Even though the clarinet was old and broken, he managed to still learn how to play the song Marry Had A Little Lamb on the same day it was taught. Soon after, the clarinet needed repair, but his grandmother was poor and couldn't afford the repair; instead, he played the school band's bass clarinet. Bing was a quiet, shy kid in school who kept to himself, but found a love for music at an early age. During his 7th and 8th grade year Bing learned how to play other instruments such as the French Horn, Baritone, Piano and Percussion. In addition to his studies while in middle school his 8th grade year, he took private lessons on the French horn twice a week after school. Bing came in contact with the saxophone in the 9th grade after hearing a Kenny G song at a friend's house. Taking the basics of what he had already learned from other instruments, he taught himself how to play the saxophone and by practicing along with records (mostly of Kenny G and Grover Washington, Jr.) His first saxophone was a Yamaha YAS23 alto.

== Career ==
Aaron Bing is a Dominican American musician/actor whose professional work includes performances on stage, television, and in films. He has written and produced six albums to date. "Always" (2005) and "Christmas Dream" (2009) before recording Grammy considered albums such as '"Secret Place" (2010) "Rebirth" (2011) Legacy (2012) and Otra Parte Dé Mí (2013). He has collaborated with such artists as Tevin Campbell remaking a Berry Gordy Motown hit "Maybe Tomorrow" (2014) and with recording artist Dwele who was featured on his remixed single "Escape" (2012). He has also worked with legend producer Preston Glass who's noted for Whitney Houston and Kenny G. His upcoming movie feature is "Christmas Baby Girl" (2018)

== Quick Facts ==
Award-winning saxophone player Aaron Bing, whose memorable performances sharing the stage with The Temptations, Frankie Beverly, Tyrese, Gladys Knight, Jeffrey Osborne and Brian McKnight inspires a new generation of jazz fans.

Aaron heard Kenny G for the first time in the 9th grade. He liked the sound and was inspired to play the saxophone. Since then, he went on to learn 21 different instruments with the soprano saxophone now being his main instrument.

He has produced six albums to date: Always, Christmas Dream, Secret Place, Rebirth, which made the 54th Grammy ballot, Legacy 55th Grammy ballot Otra Parte De Mi which is a favorite contender in the Latin Jazz category for the 14th Latin Grammy Awards and the album “Awakening” featuring a vocal duet with Tevin Campbell 58th Grammy ballot.

Aaron Bing's vision is to continue to produce albums as well as build and establish his own record label. He has a very strong intention to give back and help schools keep their music programs in place by supporting initiatives such as MusiCares and VH1's Save The Music Foundation.
