= Pyhäsalmi Mine =

Zinc and copper mine in Finland

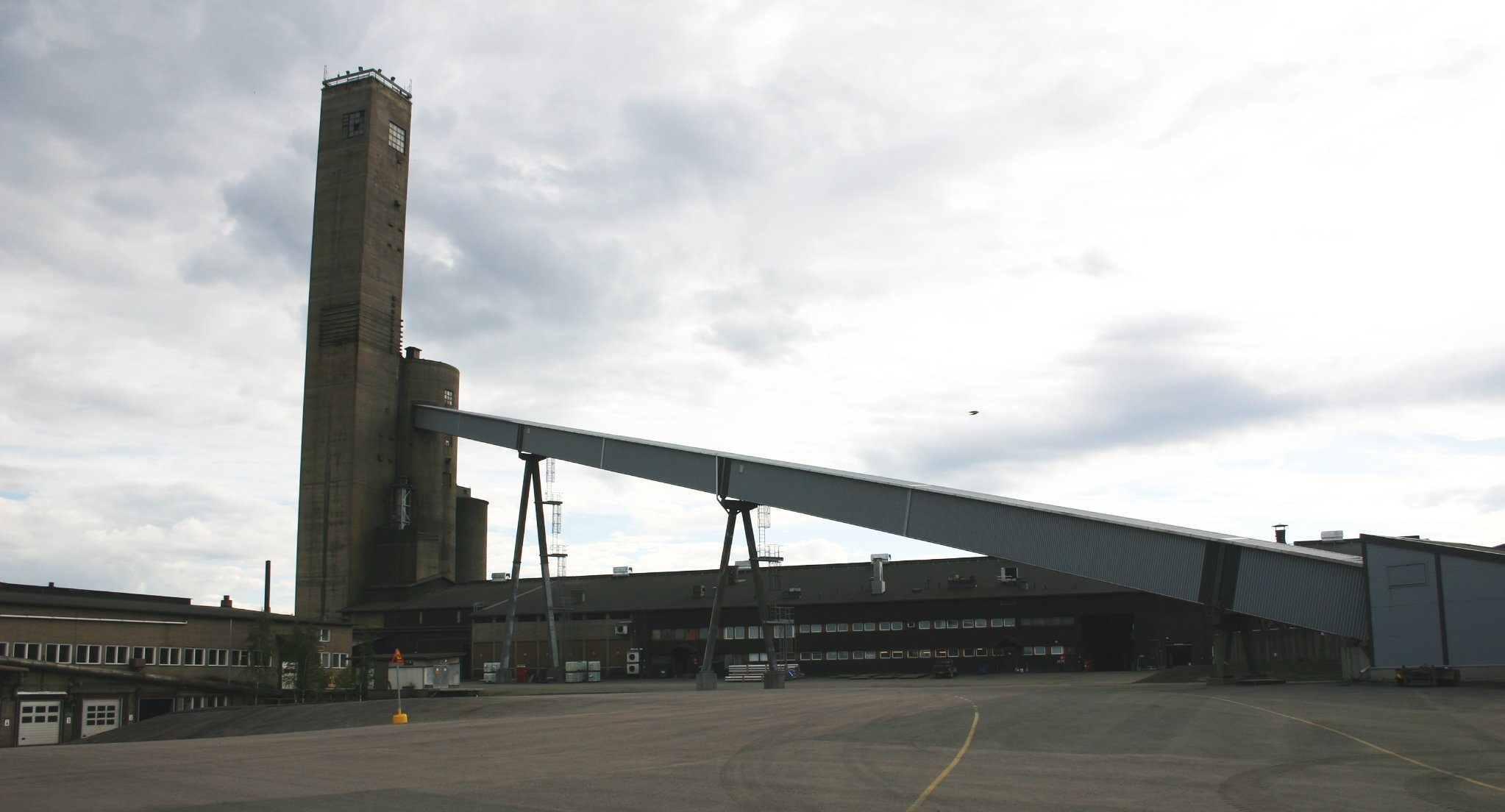
- Old tower and surrounding buildings of Pyhäsalmi mine

- Location within Finland
- Location: Pyhäjärvi, Northern Ostrobothnia, Finland; 63°39′31″N 26°02′28″E
- Products: Copper, Zinc, pyrite, Silver, Gold
- Type: Underground
- Opened: March 1, 1962

Pyhäsalmi Mine is a former zinc and copper mine, located in the Pyhäjärvi municipality in the south of Northern Ostrobothnia province, Finland. It was at times the deepest active base metal mine in Europe, having a depth of 1,444 metres or 4,738 feet..

The mine was due to be shut down in 2019, but due to an increase in demand for pyrite from Yara in Siilinjärvi, mining was extended to continue approximately 14 more months. Pyrite is a byproduct of copper and zinc mining. Mining finally shut down in August 2022. Above-ground refining will continue until 2025.

Callio is a project to oversee the reuse of the Pyhäsalmi Mine once mining activities are halted permanently. The aim is to make the mine into a hospitable operating environment for businesses and an underground research facility. It is a joint project by the town of Pyhäjärvi and the University of Oulu.

== History ==
The mine was opened in 1962 by Outokumpu, sold to Inmet mining in 2002, and obtained by First Quantum Minerals in 2013. Mining activities are projected to end in 2019, but above-ground operations will continue until 2025.

In 1958 a local farmer discovered gossan ore during a well construction. Shortly after a sample was delivered to Outokumpu Corporation for analysis and a more thorough geological survey was commenced, revealing a rich volcanogenic massive sulfide ore deposit (VMS-deposit) rich in zinc and copper. In 1959 a decision was made to open a new mine in the area and after few years of construction the mine was opened on March 1, 1962.

Pyhäsalmi mine was worked as an open cast pit until 1967, when underground mining operations commenced. In 1975, open cast mining was stopped. During the years the underground mine has been made gradually deeper. The so-called Olli Shaft was completed in 1985, making the mine 730 metres (2,400 ft) deep. New ore was discovered yet deeper, and a depth of 1,050 metres (3,440 ft) was reached in 1996. Later a new shaft, called Timo Shaft was built to exploit the ore deposit between 1,050 and 1,440 metres (3,445 and 4,724 ft). Timo Shaft's construction work completed in 2001. By 2003, 38.2 million tons of ore have been processed, containing 1.2% copper, 3.1% zinc, gold 0.46 grams per ton, and silver 14.6 grams per ton. 15.6 million tons of ore remained.

The mine safety has improved significantly over the last decades, and the underground mine has become a test bed for new (often award-winning) access control, monitoring and automation technology. Underground accidents in Pyhäsalmi are very rare, and the last fatality occurred in 1995. Several easily contained on-ground refinery fires have however occurred at the site during the 2000s. In 2012, explosives contaminated with pyrite ore were sent from the Pyhäsalmi mine for destruction at the Forcit ammunition factory in Vihtavuori, where (after a year in storage) the container started to heat up and smoke. The reason for this potentially dangerous situation was revealed to be careless handling and packaging at the mine. This prompted significant changes in the safety protocols, and since 2013 all hazardous waste is destroyed on-site in Pyhäsalmi.

== Facilities and Access ==
The "main level" of the mine is at 1400 meters depth and can be accessed with either the mine hoist or via the access tunnel. The main level houses a cafeteria, washrooms, showers, workshops, storage facilities, as well as a safety area. It is also home to the world's deepest sauna, at 1,410 metres (4,626 ft) underground. (Guinness World Records). Accessing the main level from the surface takes just 3 minutes using the elevator (average speed 8 m/s, maximum 12 m/s (39 ft/s, 43 km/h, or 27 mp/h)). The same descent takes about 30 minutes by car or lorry, along the 11 km long decline access tunnel. Normal working hours in the mine are from 5 am to 10 pm. Blasting is done after 10 pm when the mine is empty due to safety protocols.

Above ground facilities include the mill, hoisting towers, open blasting pit, waste pools, as well as workshops and warehouses. The mill is operated around the clock in three shifts.

== Activities ==
Pyhäsalmi Mine has hosted numerous events due to its attraction as a unique location. It has hosted the deepest concert in the world (by Agonizer at 1271 m) as well as dance performances. The 11 km long spiral-shaped main tunnel has also seen several uphill running and cycling competitions. Activity has increased in recent years as Callio Pyhäjärvi has worked to create publicity and new opportunities for the mine in multiple fields, such as film production, public events, as well as training and education.

=== Film productions ===
Pyhäsalmi Mine can be recognized as a filming location for the new sci-fi television series White Wall, with a cast led by Aksel Hennie, Vera Vitali and Eero Milonoff when it premieres in 2020. It is a Finnish-Swedish collaboration between Yle and SVT and is the most expensive Finnish television series made, with a 900 000 euro budget per episode. The mine served as one location for filming, with sets both above and below ground, where a special film set was built 660 meters underground in abandoned storage tunnels. Filming in Pyhäsalmi took place between November 2018 and April 2019 with a film crew of 50 people. Most of the extras required were locals and even miners themselves.

Other productions have also taken note of the unique location and in October 2019 the film Hiidenkirnu Giants Kettle will film scenes at the mine.

=== Sporting events ===
Callio Extreme Run was held 19.5.2018 with over 50 participants treading the whole 11 km from the main level at 1410 meters underground to the top via the main access tunnel. The mine tunnel network consists of hundreds of kilometers of tunnel, so for the safety of the participants all other intersections and pathways were cordoned off. Adding to the challenge was the environmental conditions, as the run was constant uphill, the temperature over 23 °C and humidity varying between levels of 50%-100%. Runners all had to wear safety helmets fashioned with headlights.

Strongman Championships League Callio World Record Breakers competition was organized by Callio at Pyhäsalmi Mine on 7.9.2019. The competition was a part of the Strongman Champions League- circuit which has a total of 16 grand prix competition a year. The event was open to the public and televised as 12 strongmen from several countries participated in six events held on the mine mill grounds, as well as underground on the main level and in the open rock pit.

=== Educational programs ===
Pyhäsalmi Mine is serving as the location for the MINETRAIN project created by Callio. The MINETRAIN project is coordinated by the Oulu Mining School and aims to create a thorough training program for professionals in the mining industry. At the same time experience is gained from whether a mine heading toward closure could be transformed into a state of the art training center. The approach of the program is holistic, providing attendees with training spanning the whole life cycle of a mine. The Pyhäsalmi Mine is especially well equipped for this, because it encompasses all aspects of mining from excavation to mill processing. The program provides lectures as well as hands on learning opportunities and can be tailored to suit the participants previous experience. The first course was held in August 2019 with a class of 15 international professionals. The project leaders believe that through immersive training programs such as these, future mining operations can become more efficient and sustainable. They help the industry gain more knowledge and adopt a holistic point of view towards production and planning.

The Pyhäsalmi mine will be the site of Finland's first underground fire-, rescue- and safety training center. As of now, the closest training center of this type is in Norway. The project aims to utilize the soon to be closed mine and its already existing facilities and infrastructure. The main coordinator is Callio and the city of Pyhäjärvi with numerous professional partners and businesses, that specialize in fire extinction and safety systems, ICT solutions, and tunnel- and shaft rescue operations.

== Research and Development ==
Callio is an umbrella organization for a variety of non-mining activities in and around the mine. Of these, Callio Lab oversees scientific research and development. Proposed new activities include a secure underground data center, pumped hydroelectrical energy storage, plant and fungus growing laboratories, breeding sites for insects and fish, and several other types of underground businesses.

=== Callio Lab ===
One major project Callio pioneered is the scientifically oriented Callio Lab. Callio Lab is a multidisciplinary R&D environment aiming to utilize better the unique infrastructure and facilities of the Pyhäsalmi Mine. The underground environment has numerous possibilities for research and experimentation in fields of physics, geosciences, underground construction, microbiology, food production, and life sciences. Callio Lab aims to bring new users to the mine and facilitate the beginning of new projects. Open call is continuous and new experiments or research plans can be proposed on their website. Callio Lab's workers assist new operators in getting started, this includes providing information, safety training and transportation in the mine as well as working as a liaison between them and the mine personnel. Callio Lab is a member of the BSUIN network, which consists of underground laboratories and facilities in the Baltic region.

Callio Lab's largest underground laboratory, Lab 2, was previously the prime candidate for the LAGUNA project, which fell through due to funding issues. LAGUNA is a proposed very large volume underground neutrino observatory, designed to study e.g., the excess of matter over antimatter in the universe. Pyhäsalmi mine would have been at the optimal distance from the CERN particle accelerators, which would have provided the neutrino beams for the experiment.

=== Plant Production in Mine ===
Plant Production in Mine was a project and study conducted by the Natural Resources Institute of Finland (LUKE) in Callio Lab laboratories at 660 meters underground. The goal of the project was to study how plant production can be implemented in a controlled underground environment. The experiment began with growing common hop (Humulus lupulus) in April 2018 using hydroponic technology. Fertilization, watering, air ventilation and temperature was controlled through automation and remote control. If optimal growing conditions can be characterized, this would broach the possibility of year-round production of hops with hundreds of harvests instead of just one. This could have the potential of replacing foreign imported hops for national breweries. Other plants that have been grown in the labs are potato, woad, and common nettle.

=== Callio Edible Insects From Mine ===
Callio Edible Insects from Mine project is piloting underground insect production and is a two-year project beginning in December 2018. It is a joint collaboration between the following entities: city of Pyhäjärvi, Pyhäsalmi Mine Oy, Entocube Oy, Probot Oy, M-Solutions Oy, Muon Solutions Oy and Callio Pyhäjärvi. The aim is to build an ecological and efficient product plant. Principle characteristics of this type of production are remote control and -supervision and circular economy. Applications of technologies encompassing these characteristics can be found in subterranean living and space habitats. The tunnels of Pyhäsalmi Mine bear a resemblance to the conditions of pressurized lava tunnels in Mars and as such provide a good environment to test out such innovations. The project will also compare the differences in production above ground and underground. In July 2019 the first insect farm was built 1430 meters underground.

=== Pumped Hydroelectric Storage Facility ===
It was announced on December 4, 2019 that Pumped Hydro Storage Sweden AB and Callio have signed a co-operation agreement to build a demo model of a pumped hydroelectric energy storage facility in the Pyhäsalmi Mine. The purpose of this co-operation is to design and develop on a smaller scale a pilot facility which can later be implemented in a full-scale version. Work is already underway, including the technical plans, timetables, and financing of the project.

This is the first phase of Callio's plans for a pumped hydroelectric storage facility in Pyhäsalmi Mine. Once the creation, testing and optimizing it this demo facility for use is completed, Callio will move to phase two. Phase two aims to negotiate the fulfillment of a full-scale 75MW facility. In late 2022, the European Union approved €26.3 million for the 530 MWh project, equivalent for 7 hours.
