= Mullikkoräme mine =

Mine in Finland

Coordinates: 63°41′30.7″N 26°9′5.4″E

Mullikkoräme zinc mine was active in Pyhäjärvi between the years 1989-2000. During this time 1.2 million tonnes of ore were mined. The ore contained in average 6.08% zinc, 0.30% copper and 17.05 sulphur also one tonne of ore contained 1.01 grams of gold. The ore from the mine was transported to the mine at Pyhäsalmi to be enriched. The ore was extracted during the years 1990-1993 and 1996-2000.

== Sources ==
- Geological Survey of Finland FINZINC Database : Mullikkoräme
- GTK Tietoaineisto : The mining industry of Finland : Metal mines (In Finnish)
