= Status Minor =

Finnish progressive metal band

Status Minor are a Finnish progressive metal band from Tampere. The group, currently signed with Lion Music, has released 3 full-length albums as of 2017.

== History ==
The group was formed in 2002 by Sami Saarinen. The drummer, Rolf Pilve, also acts as the drummer for Stratovarius, and keyboardist Jukka Karinen is known from Thunderstone.

== Members ==
- Markku Kuikka (vocals)
- Jukka Karinen (keyboards)
- Sami Saarinen (guitars)
- Eero Pakkanen (bass)
- Rolf Pilve (drums)

== Discography ==
- Dialog (2009)
- Ouroboros (2012)
- Three Faces of Antoine (2017)
