= Thunderstone (band) =

Finnish power metal band

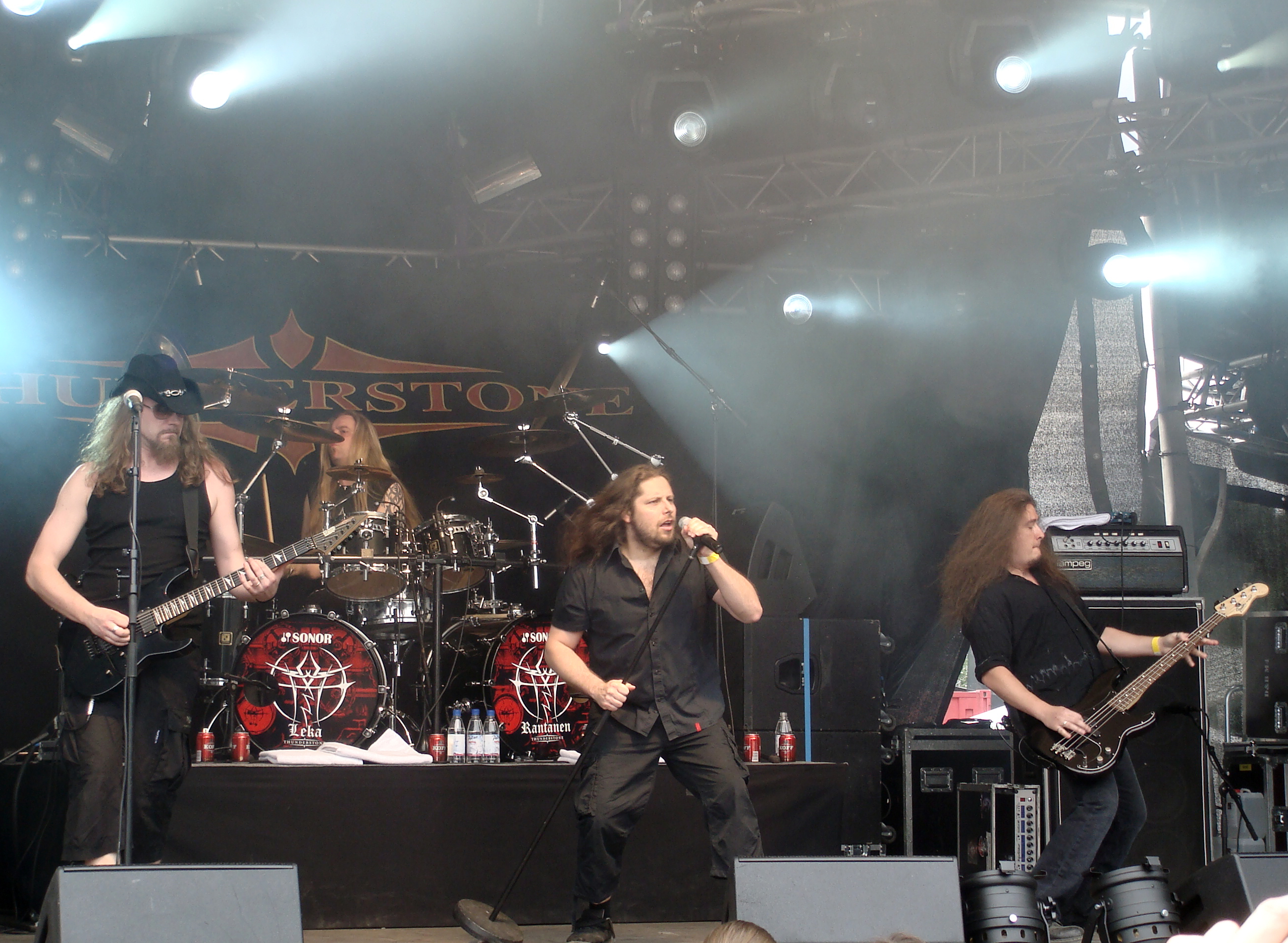
- Thunderstone at Sauna Open Air Metal Festival 2007

Background information
- Origin: Helsinki, Finland
- Genres: Power metal
- Years active: 2000–present
- Label: AFM
- Members: Pasi Rantanen; Nino Laurenne; Jukka Karinen; Titus Hjelm; Atte Palokangas
- Past members: Kari Tornack; Rick Altzi; Mirka Rantanen
- Website: thunderstone.org

Thunderstone is a Finnish power metal band from Helsinki. It was formed in 2000 by Nino Laurenne, and the line-up became complete in the following year. After the release of the band's self-titled debut album, Thunderstone, the band toured Europe supporting Stratovarius and Symphony X. They have released six studio albums, with their latest, Apocalypse Again, being released in 2016.

== History ==
Thunderstone was formed in early 2000 by ex-speed/thrash guitarist Nino Laurenne as a side project; his first demo was recorded at Sonic Pump Studios. With a growing awareness of the project's potential, a commitment was made to create a full-fledged band. Laurenne then recruited former Antidote bandmate Titus Hjelm on bass and backing vocals, Pasi Rantanen on vocals, and Mirka Rantanen on drums. By the summer of 2001, Kari Tornack joined the band as a keyboardist and Thunderstone evolved into a quintet.

Thunderstone released their self-titled debut in 2002. It was recorded at Sonic Pump Studios in Helsinki (with Laurenne as guitarist, producer, and engineer) and mixed by Mikko Karmila (Children of Bodom, Amorphis) at Finnvox Studios (Sentenced, Moonspell, Stratovarius). In 2003, after being named "Newcomer of the Year" by the readers of Rock Hard Magazine, Thunderstone celebrated their accomplishments with an extensive European tour supporting Stratovarius and Symphony X.

Thunderstone returned to Sonic Pump to record their second album, The Burning. Among the accolades the album received (such as the appearance of their promotional video for "Until We Touch the Burning Sun" on Finnish television), the album rose to No. 13 on the official Finnish album chart.

The band entered the studio again in late 2004 and started work on their third album, Tools of Destruction, which was again recorded at Sonic Pump Studios. The opening track, "Tool of the Devil", went to No. 3 on the Finnish Singles Chart. Gigs in Finland and the first headlining European tour with labelmates Crystal Ball followed.

The band returned to the studio to record their fourth album in the fall of 2006. The same year also witnessed the band's first appearance in the USA. In October, the band was invited to take part in the Finnish Eurovision Song Contest. The band was voted second, losing only narrowly to Finnish Idol Hanna Pakarinen. The Eurovision fame resulted in the release of two singles, "10.000 Ways" and "Forevermore / Face in the Mirror", which both went to the top 3 in the Finnish single charts. Finally, the efforts of the previous studio sessions came to fruition when Thunderstone's fourth studio album Evolution 4.0 was released in March 2007. Showing a darker side of the band and moving them away from the power metal of their first release, the album was liked by the fans and entered the Finnish charts at No. 10. Again, a Finnish tour and summer festivals followed.

In late 2007, the band posted this statement on their official website:

"We are sad to announce that Pasi Rantanen and Kari Tornack are no longer part of Thunderstone. Due to personal reasons and a visible lack of motivation on their part we saw it best to part with the guys, although the decision was not easy and the timing perhaps the worst possible. Everything was done in good spirits and we thank the guys for an unbelievably great and fun seven years and wish them all the best in their private endeavors. However, the first priority for us was not to let our fans down even in a situation like this. Therefore, we will go on with the upcoming co-headlining tour with Nocturnal Rites as planned. And we are most proud to announce two incredible musicians who agreed to fill in for the tour on such a short notice. On keyboards we will have none other than legendary JENS JOHANSSON, the crazy Swede and a long-time friend from Stratovarius. The vocal duties will be handled by the incredible- sounding TOMMI 'TUPLE' SALMELA who in recent years has shared the vocals with Marco Hietala in the classic Finnish metal outfit Tarot. As you can probably imagine, we are more than thrilled to have these guys on board. Book your tickets NOW!!!"

Jens Johansson was unable to make it to the tour, but Status Minor keyboardist Jukka Karinen was able to fill in, and was ultimately asked to join the band before the tour even began.

In 2009, Thunderstone released their fifth album, Dirt Metal. Around this time, Mirka Rantanen founded the side project band Hevisaurus, which saw heavy media coverage as a children's music band that plays heavy metal.

In late July/early August 2013, Thunderstone's Facebook page made several announcements, including that both singer Rick Altzi and drummer Mirka Rantanen would be parting ways with the band. The last of the notices announced the return of Pasi Rantanen on vocals. In early February 2014, band announced that their new drummer is Atte Palokangas (Agonizer, Before the Dawn).

== Members ==
- Pasi Rantanen – lead vocals (2000–2007, 2013–present)
- Nino Laurenne – guitar, backing vocals
- Titus Hjelm – bass, backing vocals
- Jukka Karinen – keyboards
- Atte Palokangas – drums

=== Former members ===
- Rick Altzi – lead vocals (2008–2013)
- Mirka "Leka" Rantanen – drums
- Kari Tornack – keyboards (2001–2007)

== Discography ==
Demos

- Demo (2001)

Studio albums

- Thunderstone (2002)
- The Burning (2004)
- Tools of Destruction (2005)
- Evolution 4.0 (2007)
- Dirt Metal (2009)
- Apocalypse Again (2016)

Compilations

- All the Best (2011)

Singles

- "Virus" (2002)
- "Tool of the Devil" (2005)
- "10.000 Ways" (2007)
- "Forevermore / Face in the Mirror" (2007)
- "I Almighty" (2009)
- "Veterans of the Apocalypse" (2016)
- "Virus 2020" (2020)
