= Birth / The End =

2007 studio album by Agonizer

- Cover art by Timo Oravakangas

Studio album by Agonizer
- Released: 4 August 2007
- Recorded: Astio-Studio A, Lappeenranta, Finland
- Genre: Heavy metal
- Length: 38:29
- Label: Spinefarm Records
- Producer: Anssi Kippo

Agonizer chronology
World of Fools (2004)	Birth / The End (2007)	Trooper (2013)

Birth / The End is the first full-length album from the melodic heavy metal band Agonizer, released in August 2007.

== Track listing ==
No.	Title	Length
1.	"Prisoner"	4:21
2.	"Harmless Hero"	4:13
3.	"Everyone of Us"	5:00
4.	"Hazardous"	5:10
5.	"Prophecy"	4:43
6.	"Sleepless"	4:16
7.	"Black Sun"	4:09
8.	"The Birth and the End"	6:37

== Personnel ==
=== Agonizer ===
- Pasi Kärkkäinen – lead vocals
- Jari-Pekka Perälä – guitar, backing vocals
- Joni Laine – guitar, backing vocals
- Jussi Tikka – bass guitar, backing vocals
- Atte Palokangas – drums
- Patrik Laine – keyboards

=== Additional musicians ===
- Anssi Kippo – additional keyboards, programming

=== Production ===
- Anssi Kippo – producing, recording, mixing
