= Thunder Rock =

Thunder Rock may refer to:

- Thunder Rock (play), a 1939 play by Robert Ardrey
- Thunder Rock (film), a 1942 film of the play, starring Michael Redgrave
- Thunder Rock (Carpenterville, Oregon), listed on the NRHP in Oregon
- Thunder Rock Scout Camp, in the state of New York

== See also ==
- Thunderstone (disambiguation)
- The Thunder Stone, the base of the equestrian statue of Peter the Great now known as the Bronze Horseman, purportedly the largest stone ever moved by man
- Thunderegg, a nodule-like rock formed within rhyolitic volcanic ash layers
