= Thunderstone (album) =

Studio album by Thunderstone
- Released: June 24, 2002
- Recorded: 2002
- Genre: Power metal
- Length: 49:26
- Label: Nuclear Blast

Thunderstone chronology
| Thunderstone (2002) | The Burning (2004) |

Thunderstone is the debut album by Finnish power metal band Thunderstone. Some versions of the album contain a bonus track which is a cover of the song "Wasted Years" by Iron Maiden.

The debut started as a side project for Antidote's Nino Laurenne and was recorded at his studio, Sonic Pump Studios, in Helsinki.. The musical style of the album is in the lineage of fellow Finns, Stratovarius.

== Track listing ==
All songs written by Nino Laurenne, except where noted.

1. "Let the Demons Free" – 3:59
2. "Virus" (Laurenne, Kari Tornack) – 4:49
3. "World's Cry" – 4:20
4. "Me, My Enemy" – 3:41
5. "Will to Power" (Laurenne, Tornack) – 8:33
6. "Weak" (Laurenne, Tornack) – 3:10
7. "Eyes of a Stranger" (Laurenne, Tornack, Mirka Rantanen) – 5:23
8. "Like Father, Like Son" – 5:35
9. "Voice in a Dream" – 4:39
10. "Spread My Wings" (Laurenne, Chuckii Booker) – 5:17
11. "Diamonds And Rust" (Joan Baez Cover) (Japanese Bonus Track) - 3:25
12. "Wasted Years" (Iron Maiden Cover) (Limited Edition Bonus Track) - 5:30

== Personnel ==
- Pasi Rantanen - lead vocals
- Nino Laurenne- guitar, backing vocal
- Titus Hjelm - bass, backing vocal
- Mirka "Leka" Rantanen - drums
- Kari Tornack - keyboards
