= Agonizer =

Finnish heavy metal band

- Origin: Pyhäjärvi, Finland
- Genres: Heavy metal
- Years active: 1998–present
- Labels: Spinefarm Records
- Members: J-P "Jazzo" Perälä; Jussi "Tuzah" Tikka; Joni "Jonez" Laine; Patrik Laine; Atte Palokangas
- Past members: Olli Solitanner; Lasse Löytynoja; Toni Qvick; Mika Heinonen; Pasi "Modi" Kärkkäinen

Agonizer is a heavy metal band from Pyhäjärvi, Finland.

== History ==
Agonizer formed in 1998 with the six-man line-up of Olli Solitanner on vocals, Mika Heinonen playing the keyboard and providing back-up vocals, J-P Perälä and Lasse Löytynoja on guitar, Jussi Tikka on bass and Toni Qvick playing the drums, recording their first demo 'Eternal Night' at Studio Jambo in Iisalmi.

The demo was received well by Finnish music magazines, and Agonizer followed it up in 1999 with Last Sign of Light, recorded at Astia Studios in Lappeenranta, a studio noted for its favour by Children of Bodom. Shortly after recording, vocalist Olli Solitanner left the band, and was replaced by Pasi Kärkkäinen, who lent a distinctly different singing style to the music. The band liked his style enough to return to Astia Studios to re-record the vocals for Last Sign of Light. Shortly after this, they played alongside Children of Bodom, Amorphis and Sonata Arctica at several gigs.

In 2001, Agonizer recorded their third demo, Lord of Lies, again at Astia Studios. This demo was also well-received, but it was not until the next year that Century Records in Germany called the band. After negotiating for six months, Agonizer emerged without a contract.

Agonizer released Anthems of Agony, a compilation of songs from their previous demos, in 2002. That summer, guitarist Lasse Löytynoja left and Joni Laine stepped in to take his place. Again, the band found a new element to their music. By 2003, their fourth demo, entitled Cain was released. It won 'Demo of the Month' award in Finnish music magazine 'Rumba', and received airplay in England, Brazil, Germany, Greece, Belgium, Peru, The Netherlands, Lithuania, and Spain.

World of Fools, their fifth demo EP, was released in March 2004, again to positive reviews.

Agonizer was selected to play at the first Finnish Metal Expo, where they reached the contest finals to play alongside three other bands after being chosen from a total line-up of 148 bands. However, the Expo also heralded the departure of their drummer, Toni Qvick, after what were cited as being 'long-standing differences'. His position was filled by Atte Palokangas.

Shortly after the Finnish Metal Expo, Mika Heinonen left the band. Agonizer initially considered eliminating keyboards altogether, but ultimately decided to bring on Patrik Laine, Joni's younger brother, in that role.

In April 2007, Agonizer signed a recording contract with Spinefarm Records. The release gig for the debut album Birth / The End (August 2007) (Heavy Metal Underground +1400) was held at Pyhäsalmi Mine at a depth of 1410m, which set, at the time, the Guinness World record for deepest concert underground.

In April 2016, Agonizer was signed to highly regarded German Label, 7hard - a Division of 7us media Group, for the worldwide release of their Album "Visions of the Blind". The album was released in June 2016 in Germany and was promoted by Derer - Consulting.

== Band members ==
=== Current members ===
- J-P "Jazzo" Perälä - guitar, backing vocals (1998–present)
- Joni "Jonez" Laine - guitar, backing vocals (2002–present)
- Jussi "Tuzah" Tikka - bass, backing vocals (1998–present)
- Patrik Laine - keyboard (2005–present)
- Atte Palokangas - drums (2004–present)

=== Former members ===
- Olli Solitanner - lead vocals (1998–1999)
- Lasse Löytynoja - guitar (1998–2002)
- Mika Heinonen - keyboards (1998–2004)
- Toni Qvick - drums (1998–2004)
- Pasi "Modi" Kärkkäinen - lead vocals (1999–2009)

== Discography ==
- Eternal Night EP (1998)
- Last Sign of Light EP (1999)
- Lord of Lies EP (2001)
- Anthems of Agony EP (2002)
- Cain EP (2003)
- World of Fools EP (2004)
- Birth / The End (2007)
- Trooper (single) (2013)
- Visions of the Blind (2016)
