= Titus Hjelm =

Finnish bassist and academic

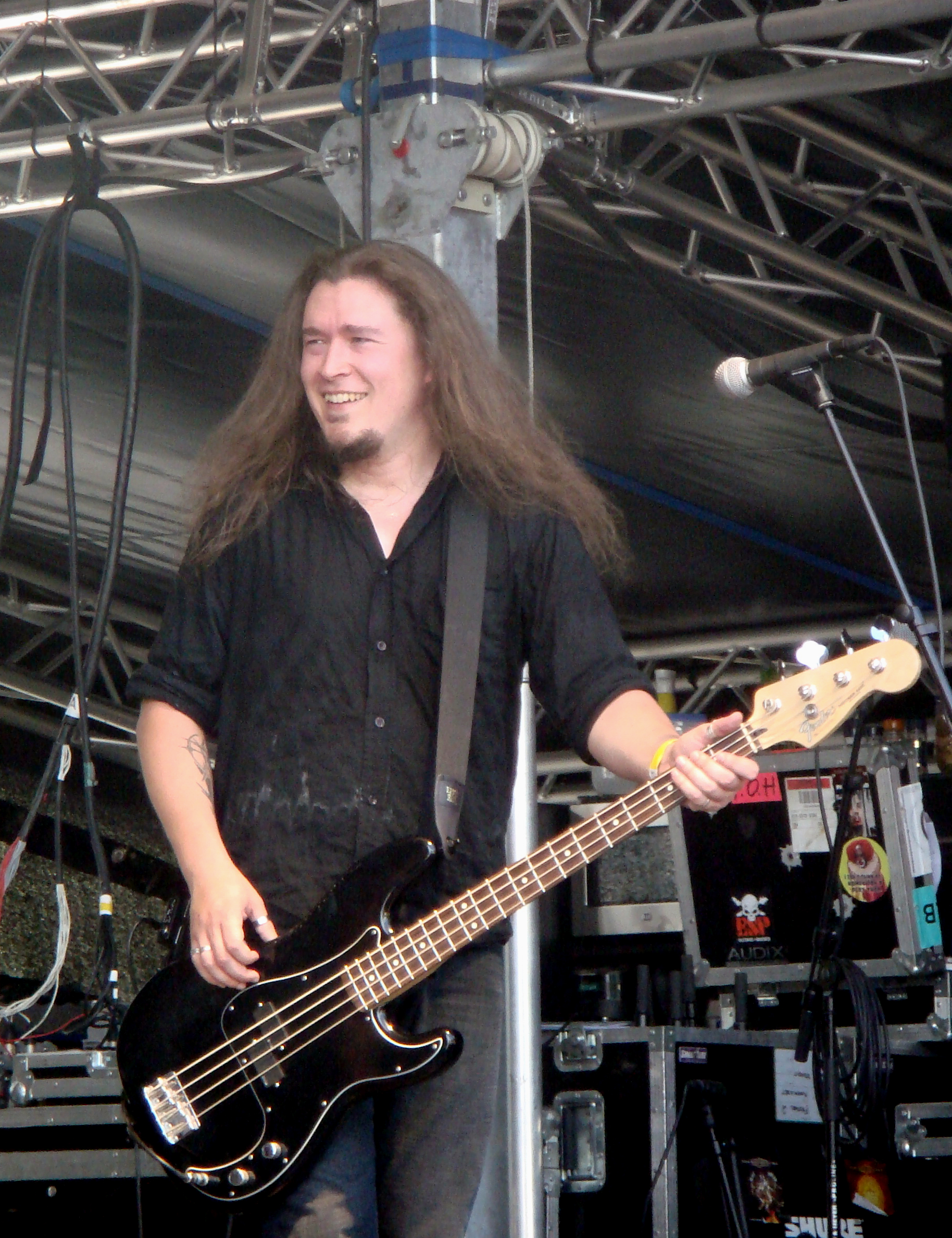
Hjelm with Thunderstone in 2007

Jan Titus Olivier Hjelm (born 15 October 1974) is a Finnish musician and professor of religious studies at University of Helsinki, Finland. He plays bass guitar in the power metal band Thunderstone, which formed in 2000. Previously, he played with the Incredible Brainshells and thrash metal band Antidote. He states his influences as Kiss, Whitesnake and Led Zeppelin. Hjelm participated with Thunderstone in Euroviisut 2007, the Finnish national final for the Eurovision Song Contest, with the songs "Face in the Mirror" and "Forevermore". "Face in the Mirror" qualified for the superfinal and got second place out of three.

Hjelm is a Doctor of Theology and a professor of religious studies at the University of Helsinki, Finland. Previously he was a Reader in Sociology and a lecturer of Finnish Society and Culture at the School of Slavonic and East European Studies, a part of University College London (UCL), where he teaches culture, social science, and literature courses. He returned to Finland in 2019, after living abroad for 12 years, to work as an associate professor at the University of Helinski. He was the editor-in-chief of the academic journal Sociology of Religion from 2023 to 2026. He studied Comparative Religion, History and Sociology at The University of Helsinki and has written several books concerning perspectives of popular culture and social attitudes towards religion.

== Selected publications ==
- Uusien Uskonnollisten Liikkeiden Tutkimus Ajankohtaista (2001)
- Mitä wicca on? (2005)
- Perspectives on Social Constructionism (2010)
- Religion and Social Problems (2010)
- Heavy Metal: Controversies and Countercultures (2013)
- Historical Dictionary of Finland, with George Maude (2021)
- Elements of Research Design, Policy Press, (2024)
- Peter L. Berger on Religion: The Social Reality of Religion (2024)

== Discography ==
- Thunderstone, Thunderstone (2002)
- The Burning, Thunderstone (2004)
- Tools of Destruction, Thunderstone (2005)
- Evolution 4.0, Thunderstone (2007)
- Dirt Metal, Thunderstone (2009)
