= Large Apparatus studying Grand Unification and Neutrino Astrophysics =

European project to develop a neutrino observatory

Large Apparatus studying Grand Unification and Neutrino Astrophysics or LAGUNA was a European project aimed to develop the next-generation, very large volume underground neutrino observatory. The detector was to be much bigger and more sensitive than any previous detector, and make new discoveries in the field of particle and astroparticle physics. The project involved 21 European institutions in 10 European countries, and brought together over 100 scientists.

The project assessed the feasibility of developing the observatory-infrastructure and the observatory particle detectors themselves, as well as looking for a deployment site (seven candidates) in Europe. There were two design studies, LAGUNA and LAGUNA/LBNO, which were finished in 2008 and 2011, respectively. The total prize of studies was €17 million, of which €7 million was direct funding from the EU, and rest came from the participating universities and other organizations.

In 2016, the LAGUNA project was in practice cancelled, although no official decision was made. A similar DUSEL-project in the United States was also cancelled. However, the neutrino-component of the DUSEL-project (the Long Baseline Neutrino Experiment, LBNE) was rebooted as the DUNE project and enlarged from a U.S.-only project into an international project. Many leading researchers from LAGUNA moved to DUNE. The construction of DUNE started in 2017 in Sanford Lab in South Dakota, U.S. with expected completion 2027.

== Detectors ==
There were three possible detector technologies being studied, the MEMPHYS, GLACIER and LENA detectors, MEMPHYS being a water-based detector, GLACIER being liquid argon and LENA liquid scintillator-based. All the detectors work by observing the faint light and electric charge produced when a neutrino particle interacts with a nucleus of the liquid inside the detector. The detectors will be based deep underground (even 1.4 km deep) to filter the noise that is developed by the atmospheric and cosmic particles that bombard everything at the surface of the Earth. These noise particles do not penetrate the Earth at that depth, but the neutrinos that interact only weakly with normal matter do. The detectors will be huge in size, with the liquid target mass being of order 100 000 – 1 000 000 tons.

=== LENA ===
LENA (Low Energy Neutrino Astronomy) is a liquid scintillation detector with a mass about 50 kton. Its cylindrical shaped tank with about 100 meters height and 30 meters diameter. The actual scintillation volume is surrounded by nylon barrier and buffer volume. Additionally the buffer volume is surrounded by a pure water volume. The detection mechanism of LENA will be the photomultiplier tubes, which are designed to cover partly the walls between buffer volume and water volume. The scintillation light produced in scintillation volume will be detected with those photomultiplier tubes. LENA's aim is to study low energy neutrinos originated by supernova explosions, Sun and Earth's interior.

== Scientific goals ==
The goals of the project were to: study the unification of all forces by observing proton decay (a very rare phenomenon expected to occur according to some Grand Unified Theory (GUT) models but never observed), study the galactic supernovae through neutrino-observations, study terrestrial and solar neutrinos (neutrinos are formed in nuclear processes), study the excess of matter over antimatter in the universe through observing neutrino oscillations in collaboration with CERN (that provides the neutrino-beams for the experiment; neutrinos are made in the CERN and then sent as underground beam for hundreds of kilometers through the Earth to the detectors).

== Sites ==
The candidate sites for the observatory were:

- Callio at Pyhäsalmi Mine (Finland)
- Fréjus Road Tunnel (France)
- Boulby Mine (United Kingdom)
- Umbria (this site requires a new cavern to be excavated, as in contrast to the other sites, this site is not an old mine) (Italy)
- SUNLAB (Sieroszowice UNderground LABoratory) in Polkowice-Sieroszowice mine (Poland)
- Unirea mine in Slănic (Romania)
- Canfranc Underground Laboratory (Spain)

From these candidates, the observatory location is chosen (See the project website for more information about the sites).
