= Hevisaurus =

Finnish heavy metal band

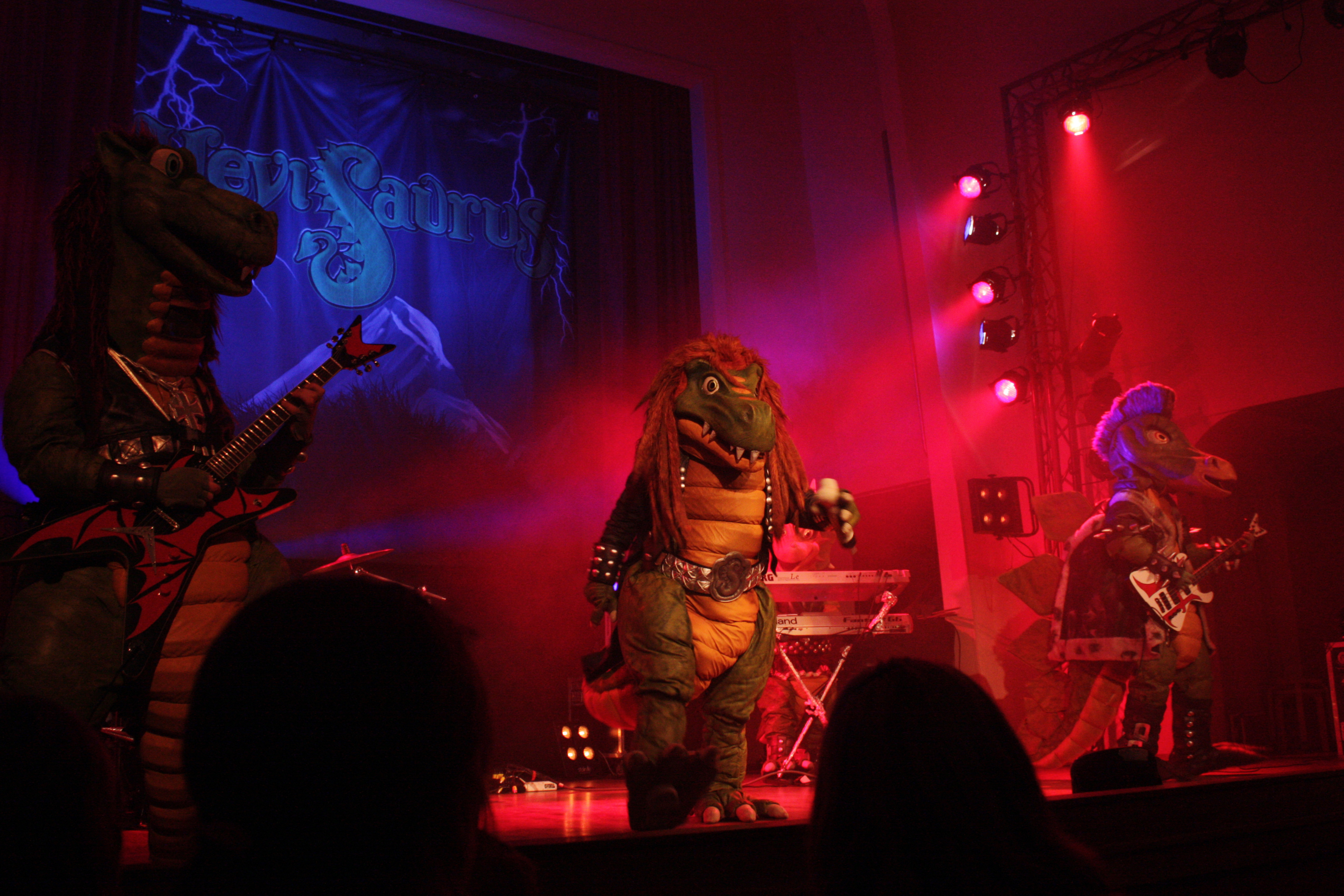
- Hevisaurus performing at Kauppakeskus Kaari on 24 January 2015

Background information
- Origin: Uusimaa, Finland
- Genres: Heavy metal; children's music; power metal
- Years active: 2009–present
- Label: Sony
- Members: "Herra Hevisaurus" "Milli Pilli" "Komppi Momppi" "Riffi Raffi" "Muffi Puffi"
- Website: www.hevisaurus.com

Hevisaurus are a Finnish heavy metal band that was formed in 2009 with music aimed at children. The band members are known for performing in dinosaur costumes. Hevisaurus's debut concert was at the Elämä Lapselle charity concert on 9 September 2009. Their first tour started at the Tavastia Club in Helsinki on 22 November 2009.

== History ==
After attending a children's music concert with his own children, Mirka Rantanen decided to start a heavy metal band for children. Rantanen and his friends from the Finnish "metalhead" community began writing and recording songs.

Hevisaurus has released seven albums to date and the albums have sold over 170,000 copies alone in Finland. Localised versions of Hevisaurus’ albums can also be found in Spanish, Hungarian, Swedish and German.

The album ”Hirmuliskojen Yö” (Night of the Dinosaurs) had the second highest album sales in Finland in 2010, when the band was rewarded with the best children album Emma (Finnish equivalent to Grammy).

The Dudesons and Hevisaurus opened up an indoor amusement park to Oulu’s Super Park in April 2013, offering Hevisaurus themed birthday party packages. The band also has its own Hevisaurus game for Android and iOS devices. In the game, players must finish the levels while listening to the band’s songs. The application also includes mini-games like puzzles. The application was released in 2013.

Hevisaurus have their photo on the walls of Hard Rock Café and have also been listed in the Hard Rock Café’s international database of artists/bands. They are the second Finnish band, besides Amorphis, who have received the honor.

A version of the band appeared on Spain's Got Talent in November of 2024, using the Argentinian's versions name and recent iterations of the German bands dinosaur suits with a Spanish singer. A video of the audition was released on the Spain's Got Talent YouTube channel, with the group receiving three yes' and being able to move on to the next round.

Another version of the band appeared on the 18th season of Britain's Got Talent. They performed a medley of Queen's We Will Rock You and Bon Jovi's Livin' on a Prayer, receiving four yes'. The english version was disqualified in the next round. According to their social media pages, the band will perform their first show in August of 2026 at Bloodstock

== Premise ==
According to legend, five dinosaur eggs made from metal survived the mass extinction some 65 million years ago in the mountain of wizards. In the year 2009, witches gathered at the same place. A giant lightning bolt hit the ground and simultaneously created ash and revealed the eggs. From the power of the witches’ chants, the eggs exploded open and five Hevisauri hatched.

== Music ==
Hevisaurus' music skirts the line between hard rock and metal. They have also been called "dinosaur metal." Due to the nature of their music being targeted at children, the lyrics are often educational such as Tahdon Maitoo, a song from Hevisaurus' album Räyh!, which celebrates the benefits of the nutritious calcium-rich goodness of milk. They are also known to sometimes adapt popular Western tunes and adapt into their heavy metal style with Finnish lyrics. An example of this is their adaptation of When Johnny Comes Marching Home on Kapteeni Koukku.

The band took a 4-year break from recording between 2019 after the "Bändikouluun!" album and came back in 2023 with the single "Hevimetallisarvet", and again in 2024 with the single "Kalloween". In 2024 the band announced a guitar solo contest for an upcoming album, and on January 10, 2025, they announced the winner had been chosen and that the album would be coming soon.

== Movie ==
The Hevisaurus movie was produced by Solar Films and was filmed in autumn 2014 and was released in the end of 2015. The movie stars the beloved Hevisaurus characters, as well as famous and rising Finnish actors.

== Disagreement with Sony Music ==
At the beginning of 2011, Mirka Rantanen, the drummer and one of the founding members, fell into a dispute between their record label Sony Music Entertainment about the copyrights and trademarks of the characters. As a result, Rantanen formed a competing band called “Sauruxet”, with the people who played in the Hevisaurus live set-up. The court ordered “Sauruxet” to pay the record label €100,000 and legal fees. Legal documents stated that the rights for the characters had always belonged to Sony Music Entertainment.

== Members ==
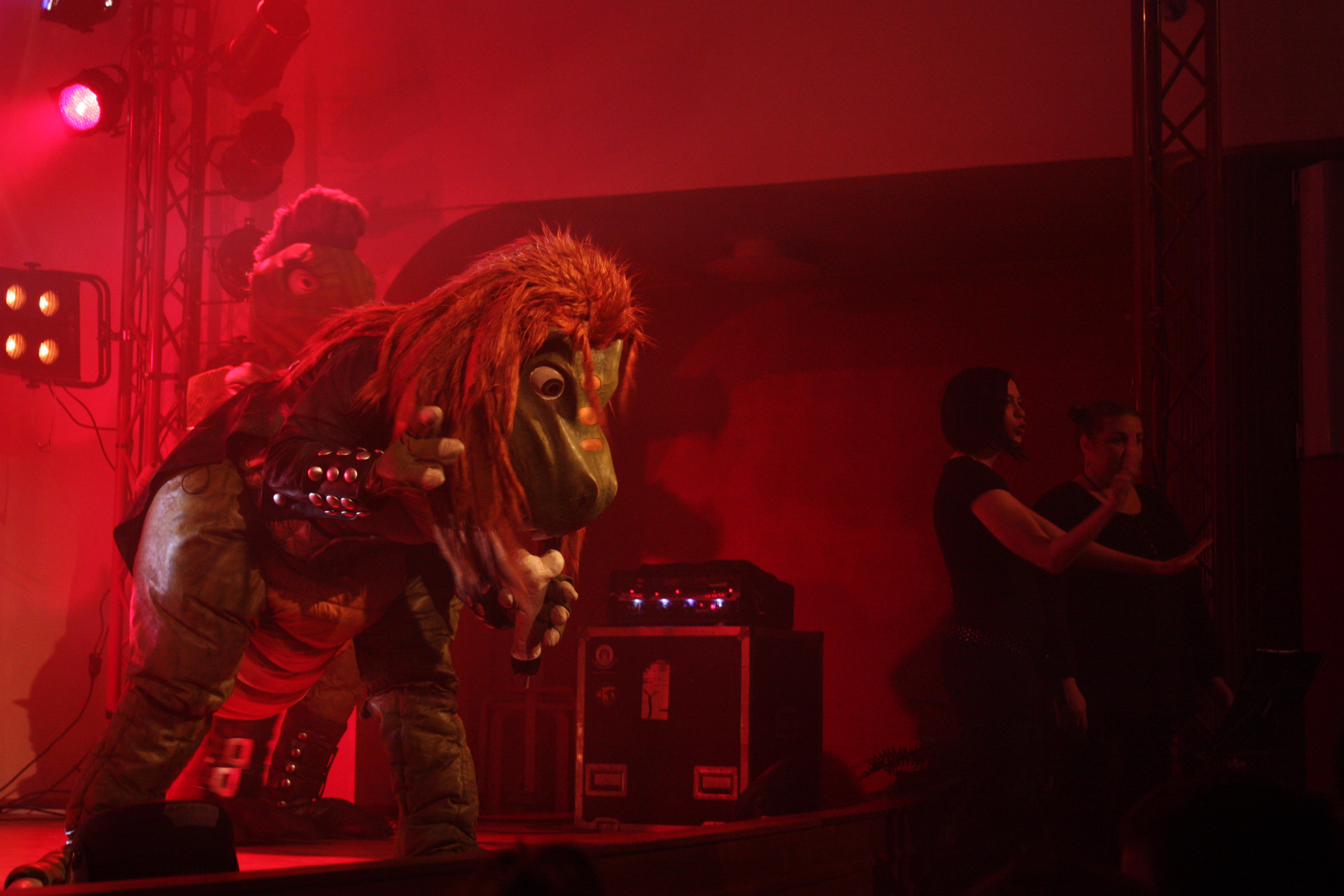
Mr. Hevisaurus

- "Herra Hevisaurus" (Mr. Hevisaurus) – vocals
- "Milli Pilli" – keyboards, vocals
- "Komppi Momppi" – drums
- "Riffi Raffi" – guitars
- "Muffi Puffi" – bass

== Discography ==
=== Albums ===
Year	Album	Peak positions
Year	Album	FIN
2009	Jurahevin kuninkaat	5
2010	Hirmuliskojen yö	3
2011	Räyh!	2
2011	Räyhällistä joulua	21
2012	Kadonneen louhikäärmeen arvoitus	1
2013	Vihreä vallankumous	10
2015	Soittakaa juranoid!	12
2017	Mikä minusta tulee isona?	29
2019	Bändikouluun!	32
2025	Maailmankiertueella	36

=== Singles ===
Year	Album	Peak positions	Album
Year	Album	FIN	Album
2010	"Hirmuliskojen pikkujoululevy"	1	

Other singles

- 2009: "Jurahevin kuninkaat"
- 2009: "Viimeinen mammutti"
- 2010: "Saurusarmeija"
- 2010: "Kurajuhlat"
- 2011: "Räyh!"
- 2011: "Tonttuheviä"
- 2012: "Ugala bugala"
- 2014: "Aarrejahti"
- 2015: "Juranoid"
- 2015: "Harri Hylje"
- 2017: "Mikä Minusta Tulee Isona?"
- 2023: "Hevimetallisarvet"
- 2024: "Kalloween"

=== Compilations ===
- Hirmuliskojen Yö / Jurahevin Kuninkaat(2011)
- Räyh! / Hirmuliskojen Yö(2012)
- Jurahevin Ikivihreät (2014)

=== Music videos ===
- Jee Hevisaurus (2009)
- Viimeinen mammutti (2010)
- Saurusarmeija (2010)
- Yhteinen joulu (2010)
- Räyh! (2011)
- Tonttuheviä (2011)
- Ugala Bugala (2012)
- Avaruuden autokorjaamo (2013)
- Liskodisko (2013)
- Aarrejahti (2014)
- Juranoid (2015)
- 100 (2019)
- Hevimetallisarvet (2023)
- Kalloween (2024)

Concert DVDs

- Hirmuliskojen Hevikonsertti(2011)
- Hevisauruksen Joulukonsertti(2012)

=== Musicals ===
- Purppuramysteeri (2010)
- Eläintarhan yövahti (2011)
- Salainen tehtävä (2012)
- Velhojenvuoren salaisuus (2013)
