= Century Records =

Century Records was a record label pressed in Redfern, Sydney in the late 1940s and early 1950s by Casper Precision Engineering. This company also pressed Esquire and some Pacific titles. The company was taken over by Festival Records in 1952. Century Records used the slogan – "If it's a hit it's on Century – If it's on Century it's a hit".
