= Vihtavuori =

Village in Laukaa, Finland

Coordinates: 62.3693°N 25.9022°E

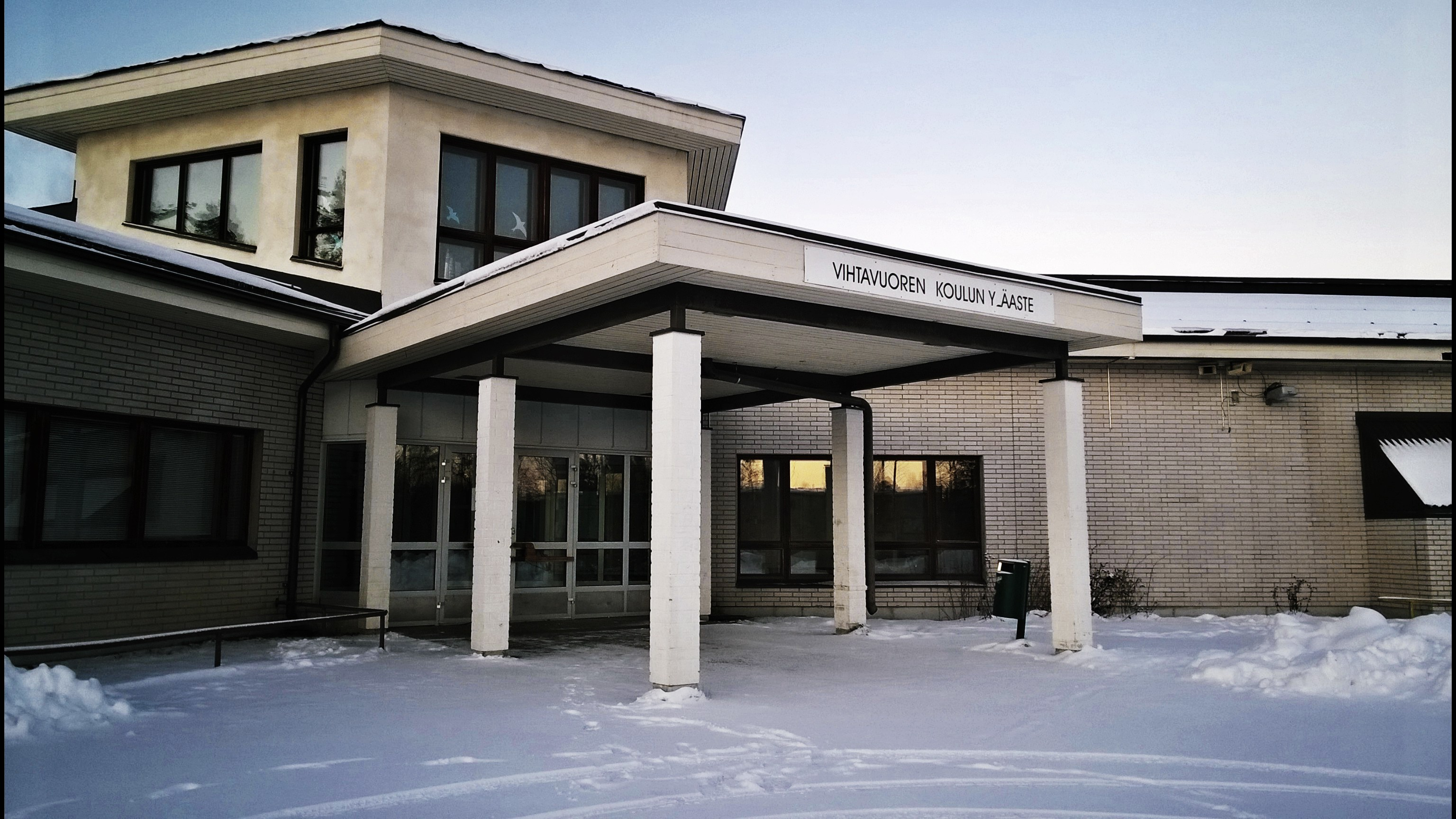
Vihtavuori school

Vihtavuori is a village in the municipality of Laukaa, Finland. It is located about 15 kilometers to the north from Jyväskylä, the largest city in the region of Central Finland, and about 7 kilometers from the center of Laukaa. The population of Vihtavuori was 2,318 in 2016.

The village is surrounded by four lakes, Iso Kuhajärvi to the east, Siikajärvi to the west, Pikku Kuhajärvi to the north, and Vihtajärvi to the south. There is a railway passing through the area, but today only a cargo train stop remains, as public transportation has moved towards bus connections.

Vihtavuori has several services, such as a school, a day care center, a chapel, a pub-restaurant and a store. There is also a gunpowder factory, which was built in 1920.

The area contains mostly single-family houses and row houses, but in the center of Vihtavuori there are also apartment buildings, which were built in the 1970s. The construction of the area was started after the gunpowder factory was built. Many of the houses in Vihtavuori were built during the 1970s and 1980s, but complementary construction has been done in the area actively.

== Gallery ==
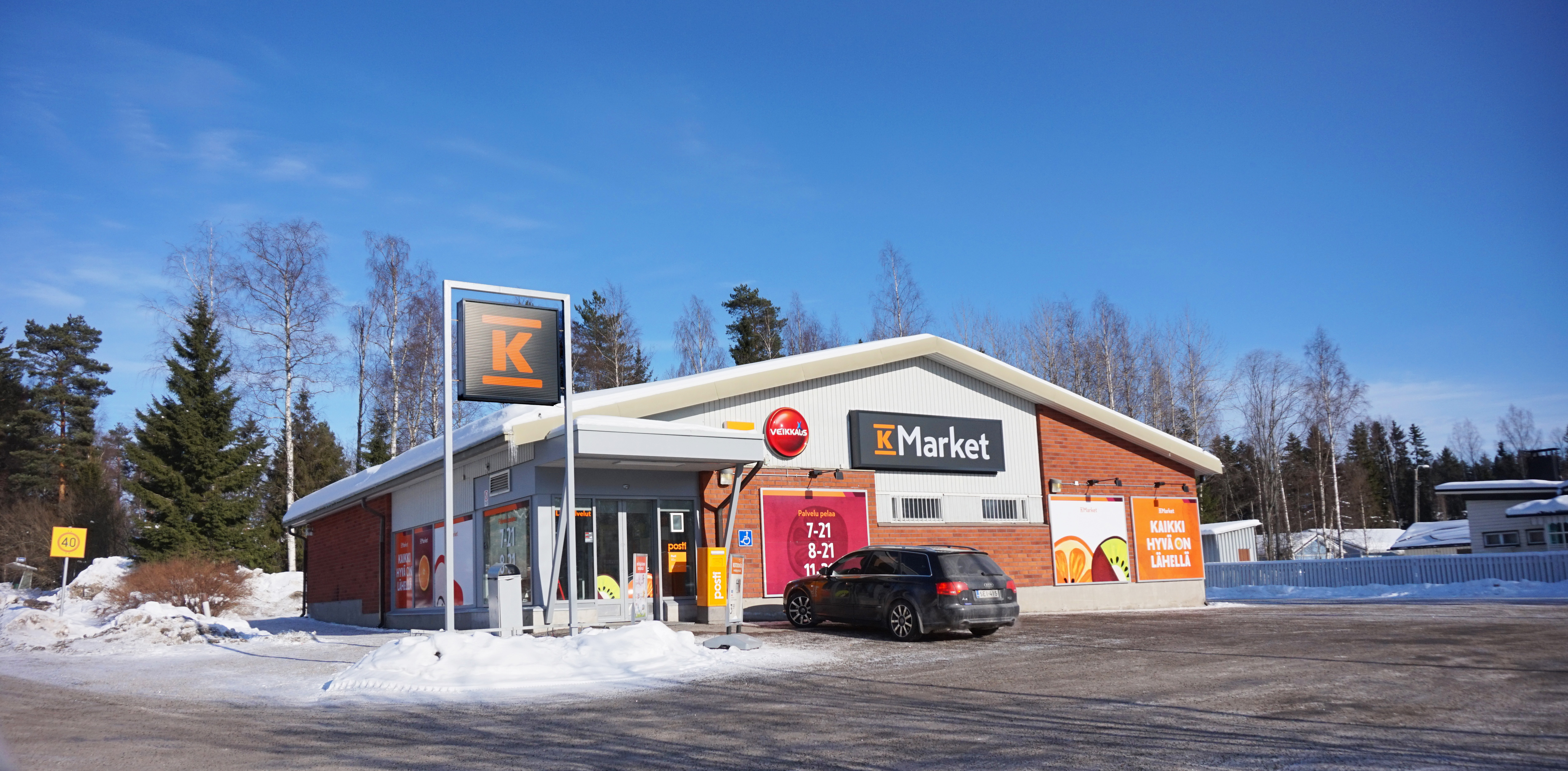
A convenience store in Vihtavuori

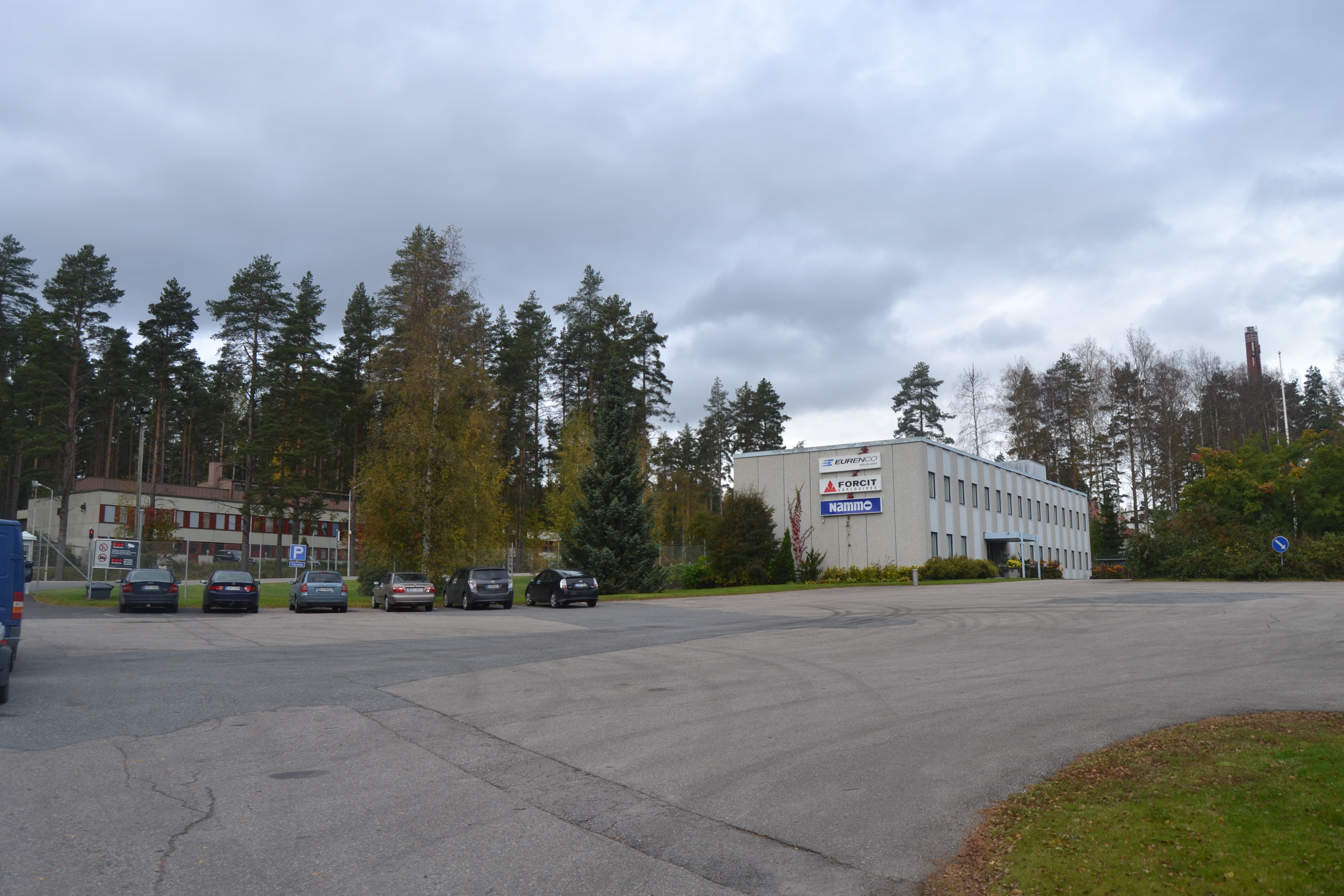
Vihtavuori gunpowder plant

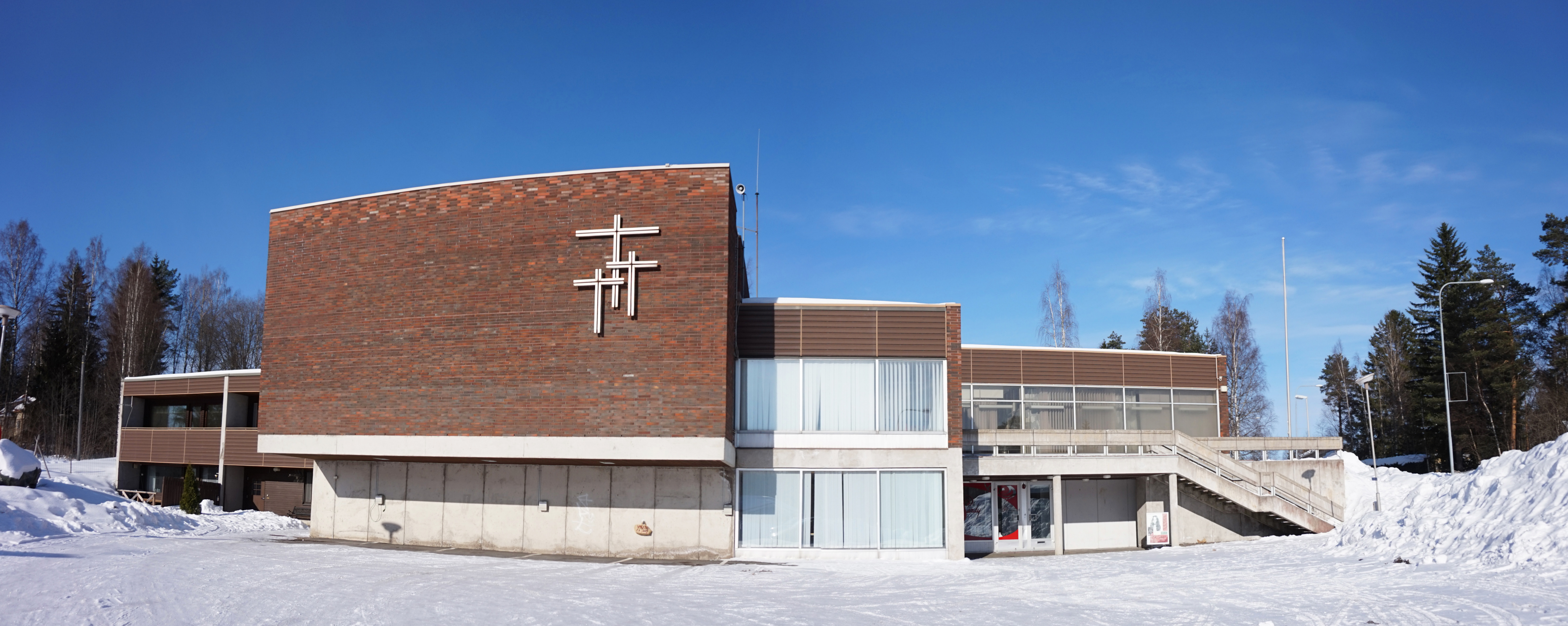
Vihtavuori chapel

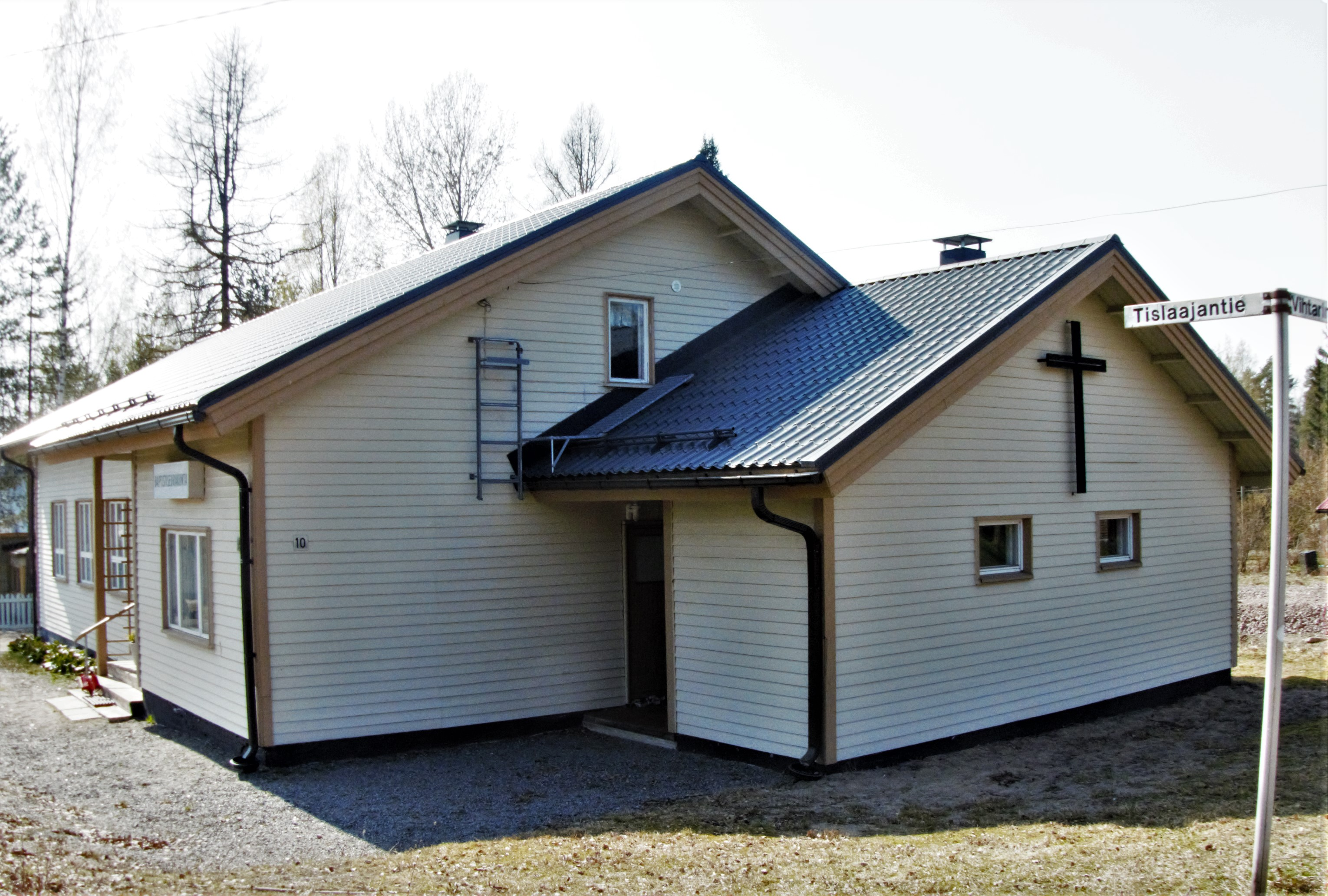
A Baptist church

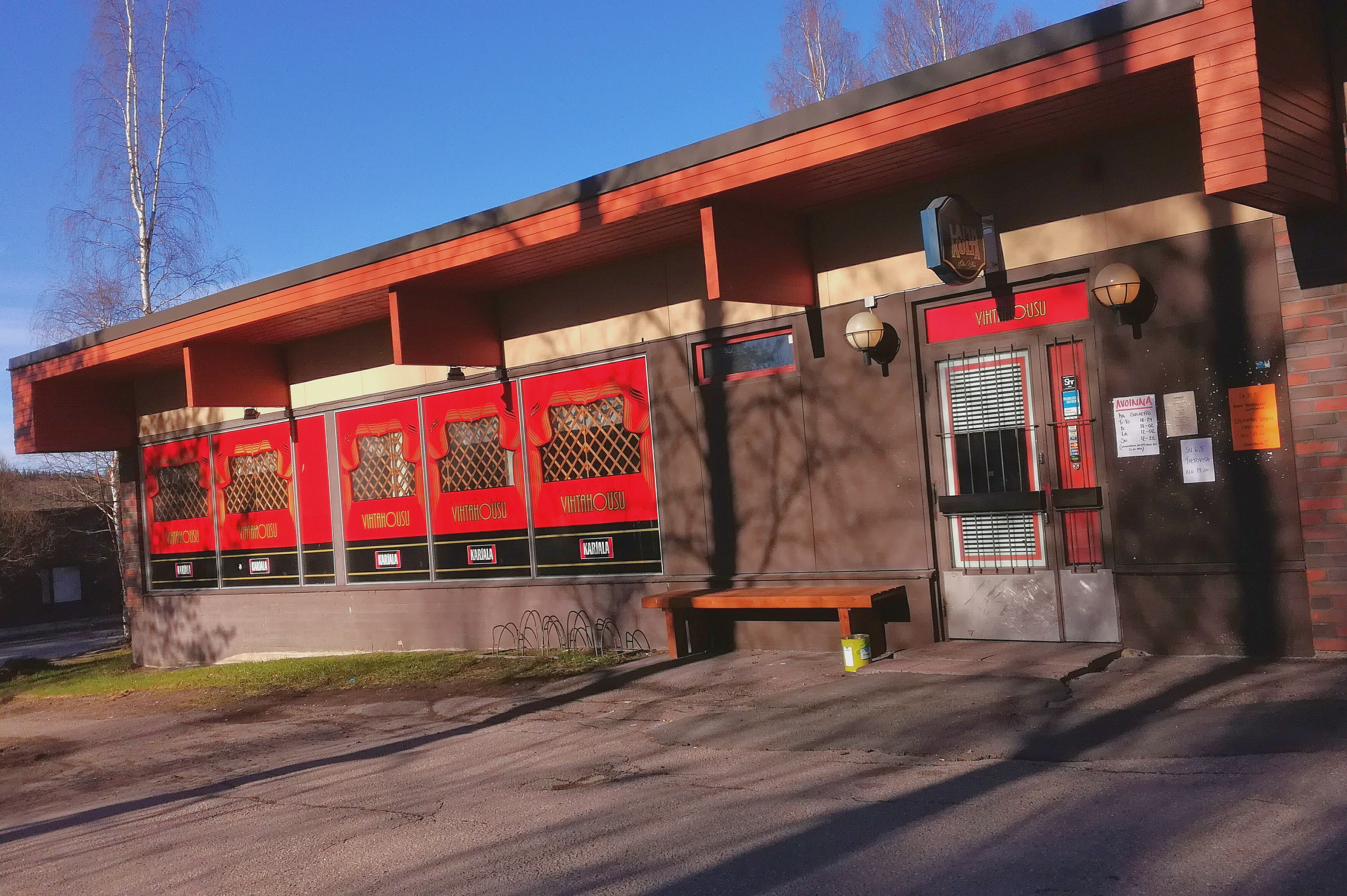
A pub in Vihtavuori

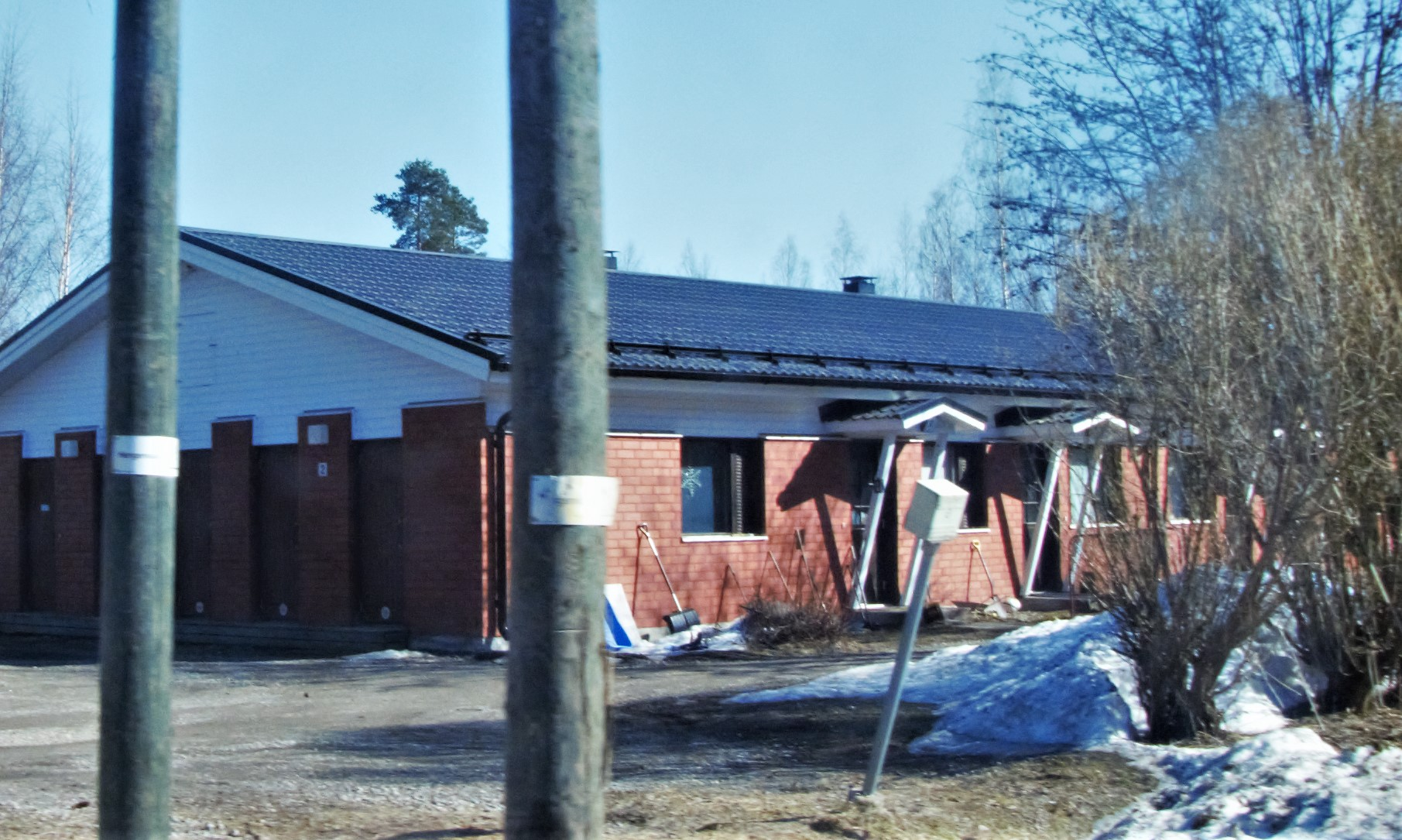
A row house built in the 1980s

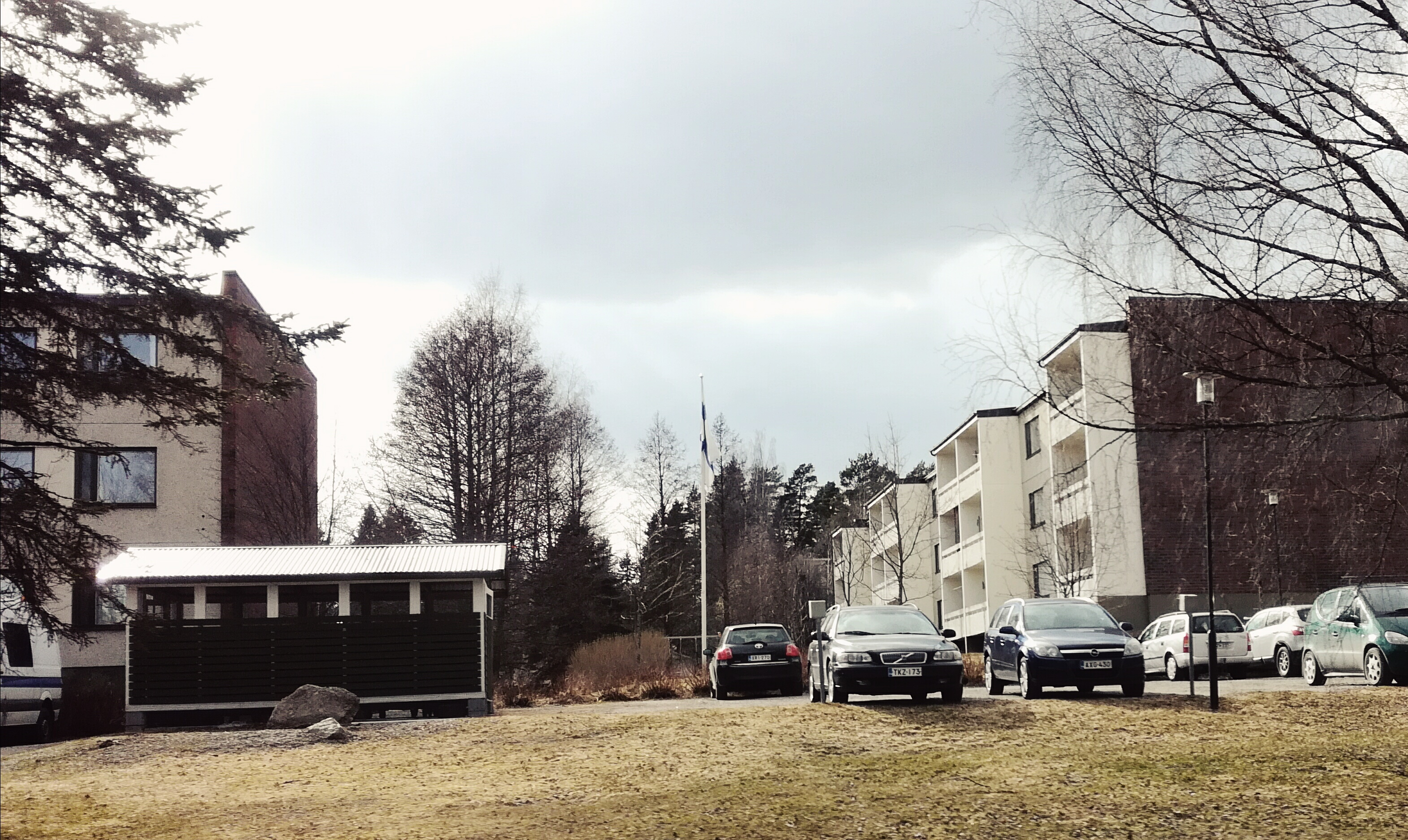
Apartment buildings in Vihtavuori
