= Vera Vitali =

Swedish actress (born 1981)

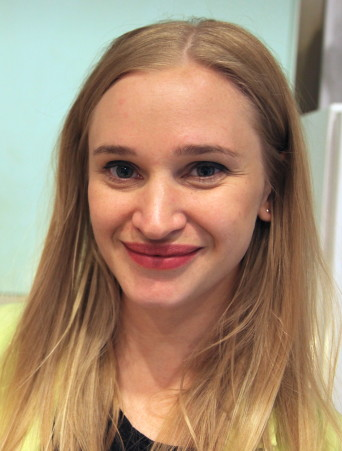
- Vitali in 2013
- Born: Anna Vitali; 1981 (age 44–45); Stockholm, Sweden
- Occupation: Actress
- Father: Leon Vitali

Vera Vitali (born 1981) is a Swedish actress and playwright, who stars as Lisa in the drama series Bonus Family.

== Biography ==
Vitali was born in 1981 in Stockholm. Her father Leon Vitali worked as Stanley Kubrick's production assistant and also starred in his last films. Her mother, Kersti Vitali, has worked as a costumier for a number of large Swedish films, musicals and theater productions. Through her father's work, she visited the London set of Kubrick's film Full Metal Jacket. Her brother Max Vitali is also an actor.

She studied acting at Stockholms Elementära Teaterskola, and she also studied in New York. She acted in the premiere of the play Bageriet at the Orion Theatre in 2007. In 2009 she wrote the comical monologue Vilja vara Vera Vitali. In 2008 she made her film debut in Ruben Östlund's film De ofrivilliga. She has acted in films such as Hela havet stormar (2009) and Cornelis (2010), Människor utan betydelse and the main role in Fijona Jonuzi's award-winning short film Girl (2011).

Vitali played the lead role in the Sveriges Television mini-series Hinsehäxan, in addition to her roles in Bonus Family and Arne Dahl's A-gruppen.
