= Pyhäjärvi =

- Town
- Pyhäjärven kaupunki Pyhäjärvi stad
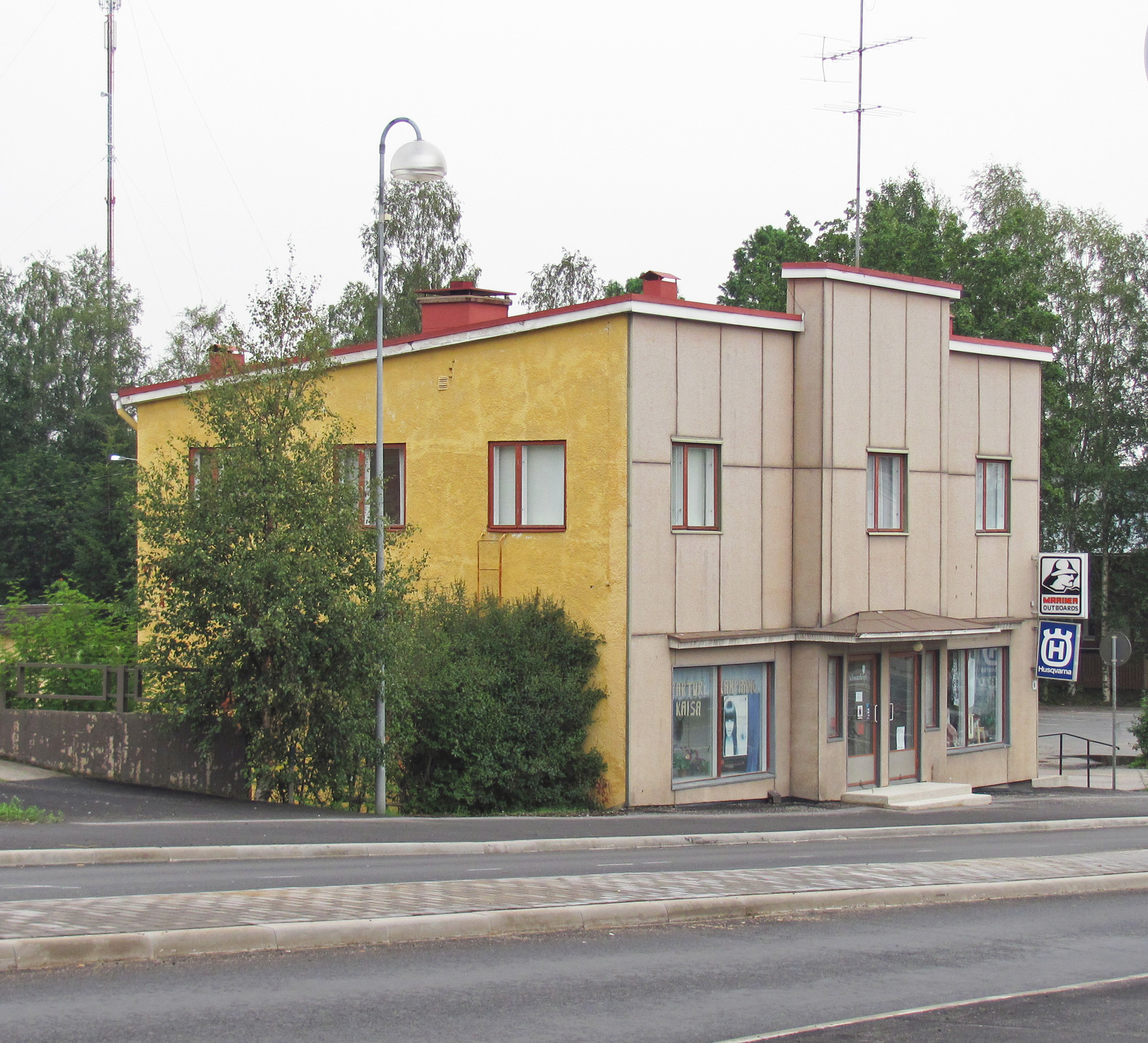

- Coat of arms

- Location of Pyhäjärvi in Finland
- Interactive map of Pyhäjärvi
- Coordinates: 63°41′N 025°59′E
- Country: Finland
- Region: North Ostrobothnia
- Sub-region: Nivala–Haapajärvi
- Charter: 1866
- Town privileges: 1993
- Seat: Pyhäsalmi

Government
  - Town manager: Henrik Kiviniemi

Area (2018-01-01)
  - Total: 1,459.46 km^{2} (563.50 sq mi)
  - Land: 1,310.25 km^{2} (505.89 sq mi)
  - Water: 148.42 km^{2} (57.31 sq mi)
  - Rank: 53rd largest in Finland

Population (2025-12-31)
  - Total: 4,551
  - Rank: 173rd largest in Finland
  - Density: 3.47/km^{2} (9.0/sq mi)

Population by native language
  - Finnish: 97% (official)
  - Others: 3%

Population by age
  - 0 to 14: 14.2%
  - 15 to 64: 50.3%
  - 65 or older: 35.5%
- Time zone: UTC+02:00 (EET)
  - Summer (DST): UTC+03:00 (EEST)
- Website: www.pyhajarvi.fi

Pyhäjärvi (Finnish: [ˈpyhæˌjærʋi], 1993–1995 Pyhäsalmi) is a town and municipality in the south of Northern Ostrobothnia region, Finland. Pyhäjärvi also borders the North Savo and Central Finland regions. The town belongs to the subregion of Nivala–Haapajärvi. Its seat is in Pyhäsalmi.

Neighbouring municipalities are Haapajärvi, Kiuruvesi, Kärsämäki, Pielavesi, Pihtipudas and Pyhäntä. As the highway 4 (E75), the highway 27 and the Ylivieska–Iisalmi railway all run through the town, Pyhäjärvi is well situated in an intersection of communication and transport services. The town has also an airfield.

The town of Pyhäjärvi was founded in 1866, and it was then named after Lake Pyhäjärvi, a lake of 125 square kilometres (48 sq mi) and rich in fish. Pyhäjärvi became officially a town in January 1993. The town has 4,551 inhabitants (31 December 2025), of whom some 60 percent live in the two population centres Pyhäsalmi and Ruotanen. It is the second smallest town of Finland in term of population after Kaskinen in the Ostrobothnia region.

Pyhäjärvi contains Europe's deepest base metal mine, the 1,444 metres (4,738 ft) deep Pyhäsalmi Mine from where zinc and copper is mined. Underground mining was due to end in 2019, but has been granted approximately 14 months more of mining activity due to an increase in demand for pyrite from Yara in Siilinjärvi. The on-surface refinery will be operational until 2025. The mine facilities and the associated infrastructure will be used for underground business and research under the Callio Pyhäsalmi project.

== See also ==
- Outokumpu, Finland
- Siilinjärvi
