= Mirka Rantanen =

Finnish drummer

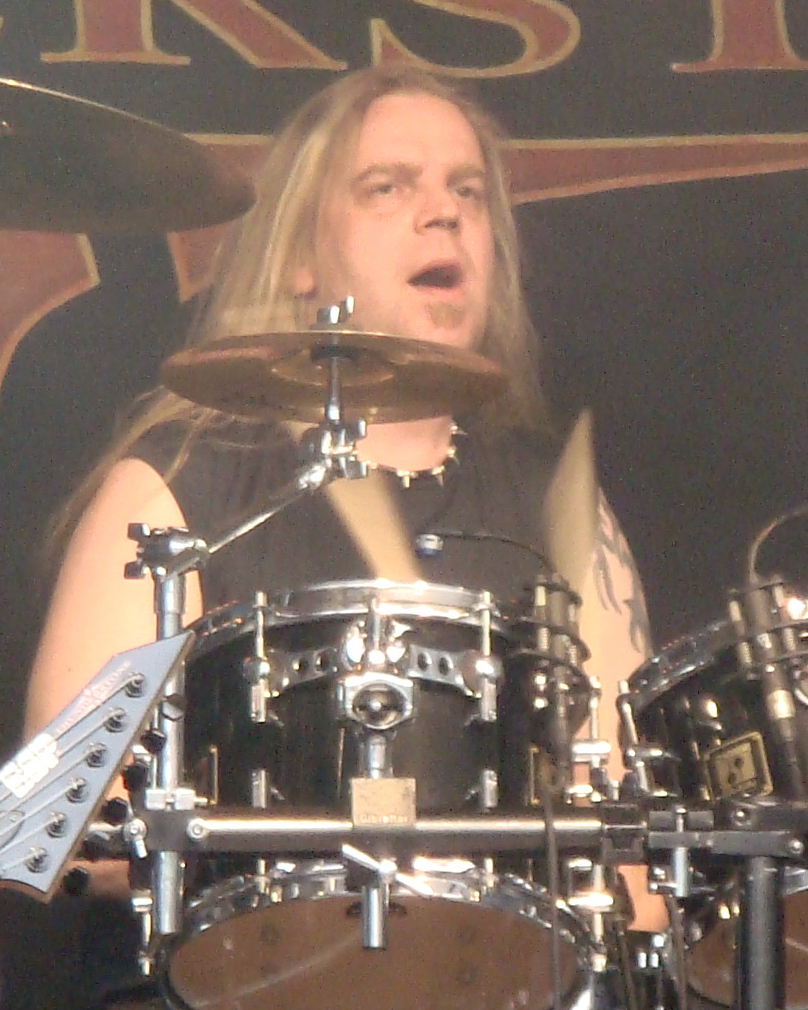
Rantanen playing with Thunderstone in 2007

Mirka Rantanen (born 1971 or 1972 (age 54–55)) is a Finnish musician. He was the drummer for power metal band Thunderstone when it formed in 2000. Rantanen has also drummed for a number of other Finnish bands, including as a session member for the supergroup Northern Kings. He currently plays drums in the band King Company. Rantanen started a heavy metal band with songs aimed at children called "Hevisaurus" in 2009. His character is an Apatosaurus called "Komppi Momppi".
