= Sparkman =

Sparkman may refer to:

- Sparkman, Arkansas
- Sparkman & Stephens
- Stump v. Sparkman
- Suicide of Bill Sparkman
- Sparkman-Hillcrest Memorial Park Cemetery
- Sparkman-Skelley Farm
- Sparkman, the guitarist of The Weirdos, a fictional band created by Coldplay for their Music of the Spheres World Tour
- Spark Man, a Robot Master in Mega Man 3

== People with the surname ==
- Sparkman (surname)

== Schools ==
- Sparkman High School
- Sparkman High School (Arkansas)
