= Hank Aaron =

American baseball player (1934–2021)

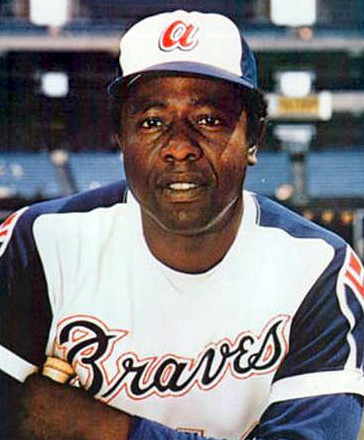
- Aaron with the Atlanta Braves in 1974
- Right fielder
- Born: February 5, 1934; Mobile, Alabama, U.S.
- Died: January 22, 2021 (aged 86); Atlanta, Georgia, U.S.
- Batted: Right Threw: Right

MLB debut
- April 13, 1954, for the Milwaukee Braves

Last MLB appearance
- October 3, 1976, for the Milwaukee Brewers

MLB statistics
- Batting average: .305
- Hits: 3,771
- Home runs: 755
- Runs batted in: 2,297
- Stats at Baseball Reference

Teams
- Milwaukee / Atlanta Braves (1954–1974); Milwaukee Brewers (1975–1976)

Career highlights and awards
- 25× All-Star (1955–1975) (Note: From 1959 to 1962, the MLB held two All-Star Games per season. Aaron played in both games each year, earning two All-Star selections for each of those four seasons.); World Series champion (1957); NL MVP (1957); 3× Gold Glove Award (1958–1960); 2× NL batting champion (1956, 1959); 4× NL home run leader (1957, 1963, 1966, 1967); 4× NL RBI leader (1957, 1960, 1963, 1966); Atlanta Braves No. 44 retired; Milwaukee Brewers No. 44 retired; Braves Hall of Fame; Milwaukee Brewers Wall of Honor; American Family Field Walk of Fame; Major League Baseball All-Century Team; MLB records: 2,297 career runs batted in; 6,856 career total bases; 1,477 career extra-base hits

Member of the National

Baseball Hall of Fame
- Induction: 1982
- Vote: 97.8% (first ballot)

Henry Louis Aaron (February 5, 1934 – January 22, 2021), nicknamed "Hammer" or "Hammerin' Hank", was an American professional baseball right fielder who played 23 seasons in Major League Baseball (MLB), from 1954 through 1976. Considered one of the greatest baseball players in history, he spent 21 seasons with the Milwaukee / Atlanta Braves in the National League (NL) and two seasons with the Milwaukee Brewers in the American League (AL). At the time of his retirement, Aaron held most of the game's key career power-hitting records. He broke the long-standing MLB record for career home runs held by Babe Ruth and remained the career leader for 33 years, until Barry Bonds surpassed his famous total of 755 in 2007. He hit 24 or more home runs every year from 1955 through 1973 and is one of only two players (the other being Alex Rodriguez) to hit 30 or more home runs in a season at least 15 times.

Aaron holds the MLB records for the most career runs batted in (RBIs) (2,297), extra base hits (1,477), and total bases (6,856). He is also third all-time for career hits (3,771) and fifth in runs scored (2,174). Aaron is one of only five players to have at least 17 seasons with 150 or more hits, and holds the record with Alex Rodriguez for the most seasons with 30 or more home runs (15). His ability as a hitter can be illustrated by his still having over 3,000 hits even without counting any of his home runs. Aaron was an NL All-Star for 20 seasons and an AL All-Star for one season, and he holds the record for the most All-Star selections (25), while sharing the record for most All-Star Games played (24) with Willie Mays and Stan Musial. Aaron was a three-time Gold Glove winner, and in 1957, he won the NL Most Valuable Player (MVP) Award when the Milwaukee Braves won the World Series.

Aaron was born and raised in and around Mobile, Alabama, one of eight children. He appeared briefly in the Negro American League and in minor league baseball before starting his major league career. By his final MLB season, Aaron was the last former Negro league baseball player on a major league roster. During his time in Major League Baseball, and especially during his run for the home run record, Aaron and his family endured extensive racist threats. His experiences fueled his activism during the civil rights movement.

Aaron was inducted into the National Baseball Hall of Fame in his first year of eligibility in 1982 and Wisconsin Athletic Hall of Fame in 1988. In 1999, MLB introduced the Hank Aaron Award to recognize the top offensive players in each league. That same year, he was one of 30 baseball players elected to the Major League Baseball All-Century Team. He was awarded the Presidential Medal of Freedom in 2002. After his retirement, Aaron held front office roles with the Atlanta Braves, including the senior vice president. He resided near Atlanta until his death in 2021.

== Early life ==
Henry Louis Aaron was born on February 5, 1934, in Mobile, Alabama, to Herbert Aaron Sr. and Estella (Pritchett) Aaron. Herbert Sr. worked as a shipyard riveter. He had seven siblings. Tommie Aaron, one of his brothers, also went on to play Major League Baseball. By the time Aaron retired, he and his brother held the record for most career home runs by a pair of siblings (768).

While he was born in a section of Mobile referred to as "Down the Bay", Aaron spent most of his youth in Toulminville. Aaron grew up in a poor family. His family could not afford baseball equipment, so he practiced by hitting bottle caps with sticks. Aaron would create his own bats and balls out of materials he found on the streets. Aaron's boyhood idol was baseball star Jackie Robinson. Aaron attended Central High School as a freshman and a sophomore. (Note: Now the Dunbar Creative and Performing Arts Magnet School, 500 St. Anthony St., Mobile. In 1955 Central High School and Dunbar Jr. High School switched locations; Central High closed in 1970 following desegregation.) At Central, Aaron played outfield and third base, helping lead his team to a Negro High School Championship. He played both football and baseball and was offered multiple football scholarships, but turned them down for baseball. Aaron was a member of the Boy Scouts of America, and he filmed a commercial for the organization in the 1970s.

Although he batted cross-handed (as a right-handed hitter, with his left hand above his right), Aaron established himself as a power hitter. As a result, in 1949, at age 15, Aaron had his first tryout with an MLB franchise, the Brooklyn Dodgers; however, he did not make the team. After this, Aaron returned to school to finish his secondary education, attending the Josephine Allen Institute, a private high school in Alabama. During his junior year, Aaron joined the Prichard Athletics, an independent Negro league team, followed by the Mobile Black Bears, another independent Negro league team. While on the Bears, Aaron earned $3 per game ($40 today), which was a dollar more than he got while on the Athletics.

== Professional career ==
=== Negro and minor leagues ===
On November 20, 1951, baseball scout Ed Scott signed Aaron to a contract on behalf of the Indianapolis Clowns of the Negro American League, where he played for three months.

Aaron started play as a 6 ft (180 cm), 180 lb (82 kg) shortstop, and earned $200 per month. As a result of his standout play with the Indianapolis Clowns, Aaron received two offers from MLB teams via telegram, one from the New York Giants and the other from the Boston Braves. Years later, Aaron remembered:

I had the Giants' contract in my hand. But the Braves offered fifty dollars a month more. That's the only thing that kept Willie Mays and me from being teammates — fifty dollars.

While with the Clowns he experienced racism. Of a time his team was in Washington, D.C. Aaron recalled:

We had breakfast while we were waiting for the rain to stop, and I can still envision sitting with the Clowns in a restaurant behind Griffith Stadium and hearing them break all the plates in the kitchen after we finished eating. What a horrible sound. Even as a kid, the irony of it hit me: here we were in the capital in the land of freedom and equality, and they had to destroy the plates that had touched the forks that had been in the mouths of Black men. If dogs had eaten off those plates, they'd have washed them.

The Howe Sports Bureau credits Aaron with a .366 batting average in 26 official Negro league games, with five home runs, 33 runs batted in (RBIs), 41 hits, and nine stolen bases.

The Braves purchased Aaron's contract from the Clowns for $10,000, which GM John Quinn thought was a steal, as he stated that he felt that Aaron was a $100,000 property. On June 12, 1952, Aaron signed with Braves' scout Dewey Griggs. During this time, he picked up the nickname "pork chops" because it "was the only thing I knew to order off the menu". A teammate later said, "the man ate pork chops three meals a day, two for breakfast".

The Braves assigned Aaron to the Eau Claire Bears, the Braves' Northern League Class-C farm team. The 1952 season proved to be very beneficial for Aaron. Playing in the infield, Aaron continued to develop as a ballplayer and made the Northern League's All-Star team. He broke his habit of hitting cross-handed and adopted the standard hitting technique. By the end of the season, Aaron had performed so well that the league made him the unanimous choice for Rookie of the Year. Although Aaron appeared in just 87 games, he scored 89 runs, had 116 hits, nine home runs, and 61 RBI. Aaron also hit for a .336 batting average. During his minor league experience, Aaron was very homesick and faced constant racism, but his brother, Herbert Jr., told Aaron not to give up the opportunity.

In 1953, the Braves promoted Aaron to the Jacksonville Braves, their Class-A affiliate in the South Atlantic League. Helped by Aaron's performance, the Braves won the league championship that year. Aaron led the league in runs (115), hits (208), doubles (36), RBIs (125), total bases (338), and batting average (.362). He won the league's Most Valuable Player Award, and had such a dominant year that one sportswriter was prompted to say, "Henry Aaron led the league in everything except hotel accommodations." Aaron's time with the Braves did not come without problems. He was one of the first Black Americans to play in the league. The 1950s were a period of racial segregation in parts of the United States, especially the southeastern portion of the country. When Aaron traveled around Jacksonville, Florida, and the surrounding areas, he was often separated from his team because of Jim Crow laws. In most circumstances, the team was responsible for arranging housing and meals for its players, but Aaron often had to make his own arrangements. The Braves' manager, Ben Geraghty, tried his best to help Aaron on and off the field. Former Braves minor league player and sportswriter Pat Jordan said, "Aaron gave [Geraghty] much of the credit for his own swift rise to stardom."

That same year, Aaron met his future wife, Barbara Lucas. The night they met, Lucas decided to attend the Braves' game. Aaron singled, doubled, and hit a home run in the game. On October 6, Aaron and Lucas got married. In 1958, Aaron's wife noted that during the offseason, he liked "to sit and watch those shooting westerns". Aaron also enjoyed cooking and fishing.

Aaron spent the winter of 1953 playing in Puerto Rico. Mickey Owen, the team's manager, helped Aaron with his batting stance. Until then, Aaron had hit most pitches to left field or center field, but after working with Owen, Aaron was able to hit the ball more effectively all over the field. During his stay in Puerto Rico, Owen also helped Aaron transition from second base to the outfield. Aaron had not played well at second base, but Owen noted that Aaron could catch fly balls and throw them well from the outfield to the infield.

The stint in Puerto Rico also allowed Aaron to avoid being drafted into military service. Though the Korean War was over, people were still being drafted. The Braves were able to speak to the draft board, making the case that Aaron could be the player to integrate the Southern Association the following season with the Atlanta Crackers. The board appears to have been convinced, as Aaron was not drafted.

=== Milwaukee / Atlanta Braves (1954–1974) ===
In 1954, Aaron attended spring training with the major league club. Although he was on the roster of its farm club, Milwaukee manager Charley Grimm later stated, "From the start, he did so well I knew we were going to have to carry him." On March 13, 1954, Milwaukee Braves left fielder Bobby Thomson fractured his ankle while sliding into second base during a spring training game. The next day, Aaron made his first spring training start for the Braves major league team, playing in left field and hitting a home run. This led Aaron to a major league contract, signed on the final day of spring training, and a Braves uniform with the number five.

On April 13, he made his major league debut and was hitless in five at-bats against the Cincinnati Redlegs. In the same game, Eddie Mathews hit two home runs, the first of a record 863 home runs the pair would hit as teammates. On April 15, Aaron collected his first major league hit, a double off St. Louis Cardinals pitcher Vic Raschi. Aaron hit his first major league home run on April 23, also off Raschi. In 122 games, Aaron batted .280 with 13 home runs and 69 RBIs before he suffered a fractured ankle on September 5. He then changed his number to 44, which would turn out to look like a "lucky number" for the slugger. Aaron would hit 44 home runs in four different seasons, and he hit his record-breaking 715th career home run off Dodgers pitcher Al Downing, who coincidentally also wore number 44.

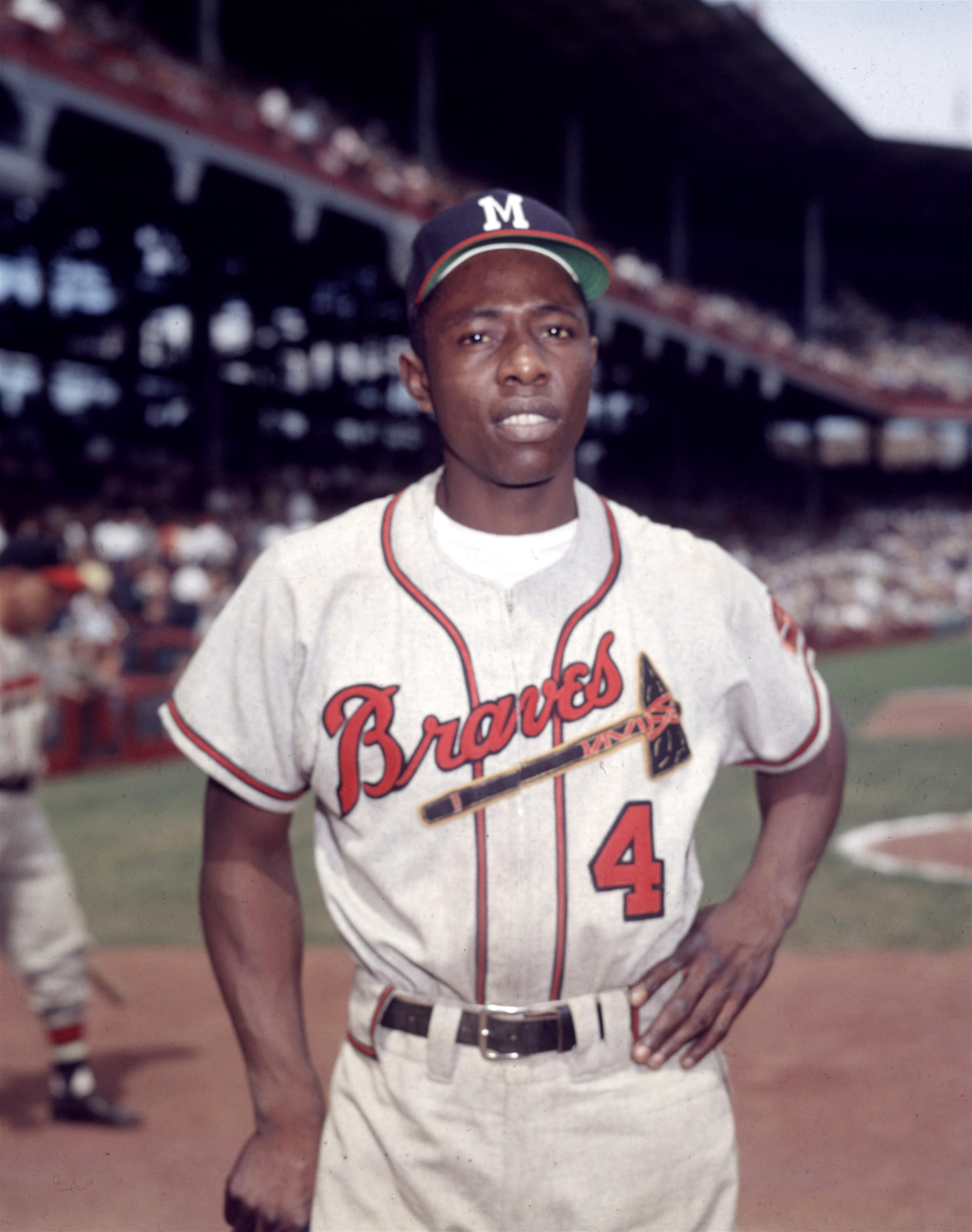
Aaron in his rookie season with the Braves in 1954

At this point, Aaron was known to family and friends primarily as "Henry". Braves' public relations director Don Davidson, observing Aaron's quiet, reserved nature, began referring to him publicly as "Hank" in order to suggest more accessibility. The nickname quickly gained currency, but "Henry" continued to be cited frequently in the media, both sometimes appearing in the same article, and Aaron would answer to either one. During his rookie year, his other well-known nicknames, "Hammerin' Hank" (by teammates) and "Bad Henry" (by opposing pitchers) are reported to have arisen.

While living in Milwaukee, Aaron resided in the Prinz House in Historic Brewers Hill. Considerably later in his career, Aaron coined "Stone-fingers", which would prove a popular handle for one of baseball's more colorful characters, the famously distance-hitting but defensively challenged first baseman Dick Stuart, reportedly "delight[ing]" even its recipient.

Sal Maglie recommended throwing low curveballs to Aaron. "He's going to swing and he'll go after almost anything," Maglie said of the Braves' slugger. "And he'll hit almost anything, so you have to be careful."

==== Prime of his career ====
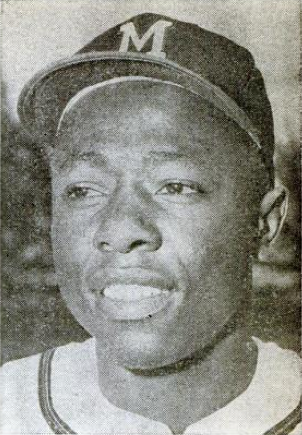
Aaron in 1960

Aaron hit .314 with 27 home runs and 106 RBI in 153 games in 1955. He was named to the NL All-Star roster for the first time; it was the first of a record 21 All-Star selections and first of a record 25 All-Star Game appearances. In 1956, Aaron hit .328 and captured the first of two NL batting titles. He was also named The Sporting News NL Player of the Year. In 1957, Aaron won his only NL MVP Award, as he had his first brush with the triple crown. He batted .322, placing third, and led the league in home runs and runs batted in. On September 23, 1957, in Milwaukee, Aaron hit a two-run walk-off home run against the St. Louis Cardinals, clinching the pennant for the Braves. After touching home plate he was carried off the field by his teammates. It is as of yet the only pennant-clinching walk-off home run in major league history in a non-playoff regular-season game.

Milwaukee went on to win the World Series against the New York Yankees, the defending champions, four games to three. Aaron did his part by hitting .393 with three homers and seven RBIs. On December 15, 1957, his wife Barbara gave birth to twins. Two days later, one of the children died. In 1958, Aaron hit .326 with 30 home runs and 95 RBI in 153 games. He led the Braves to another pennant, but this time they lost a seven-game World Series to the Yankees. Aaron finished third in the MVP race and he received his first of three Gold Glove Awards. During the next several years, Aaron had some of his best games and best seasons as a major league player. On June 21, 1959, against the San Francisco Giants, Aaron hit three two-run home runs. It was the only time in his career that he hit three home runs in a game.

In 1963, Aaron nearly won the triple crown. He led the league with 44 home runs and 130 RBI and finished third in batting average (.319). (Note: His average was .319, .007 behind the leader, Tommy Davis.) That season, Aaron became the third player to hit 30 home runs and steal 30 bases in a single season, and the first player to record 40 home runs and 30 steals in a season. He again finished third in National League MVP voting.

For the 1966 season the Braves moved to Atlanta and the new Atlanta–Fulton County Stadium. The stadium's elevation in the foothills of the Appalachian Mountains made it favorable to home run hitters, which led to the stadium's nickname, "The Launching Pad". On May 10, 1967, Aaron hit an inside-the-park home run against Jim Bunning in Philadelphia. It was the only inside-the-park home run of his career.

On June 18, 1967, Aaron was involved in a physical altercation with teammate Rico Carty on a chartered Atlanta Braves flight from Houston to Los Angeles. Carty allegedly directed a racial slur toward Aaron, resulting in a fistfight where teammates had to separate them. Afterwards, Aaron said that he was frustrated by Carty's lack of effort on defense. Aaron added, “He called me a name that I couldn’t take, and I would have fought anybody for that. It was a matter of principle and pride. If I’m called that name again, I’ll fight again.” The altercation surprised the baseball community because Aaron was known for his easy-going nature. Notably, Carty's induction to the Braves Hall of Fame in 2023 was delayed until after the death of Aaron on January 22, 2021, out of respect for the revered status Aaron held within the Braves organization.

==== Home run milestones and 3,000th hit ====
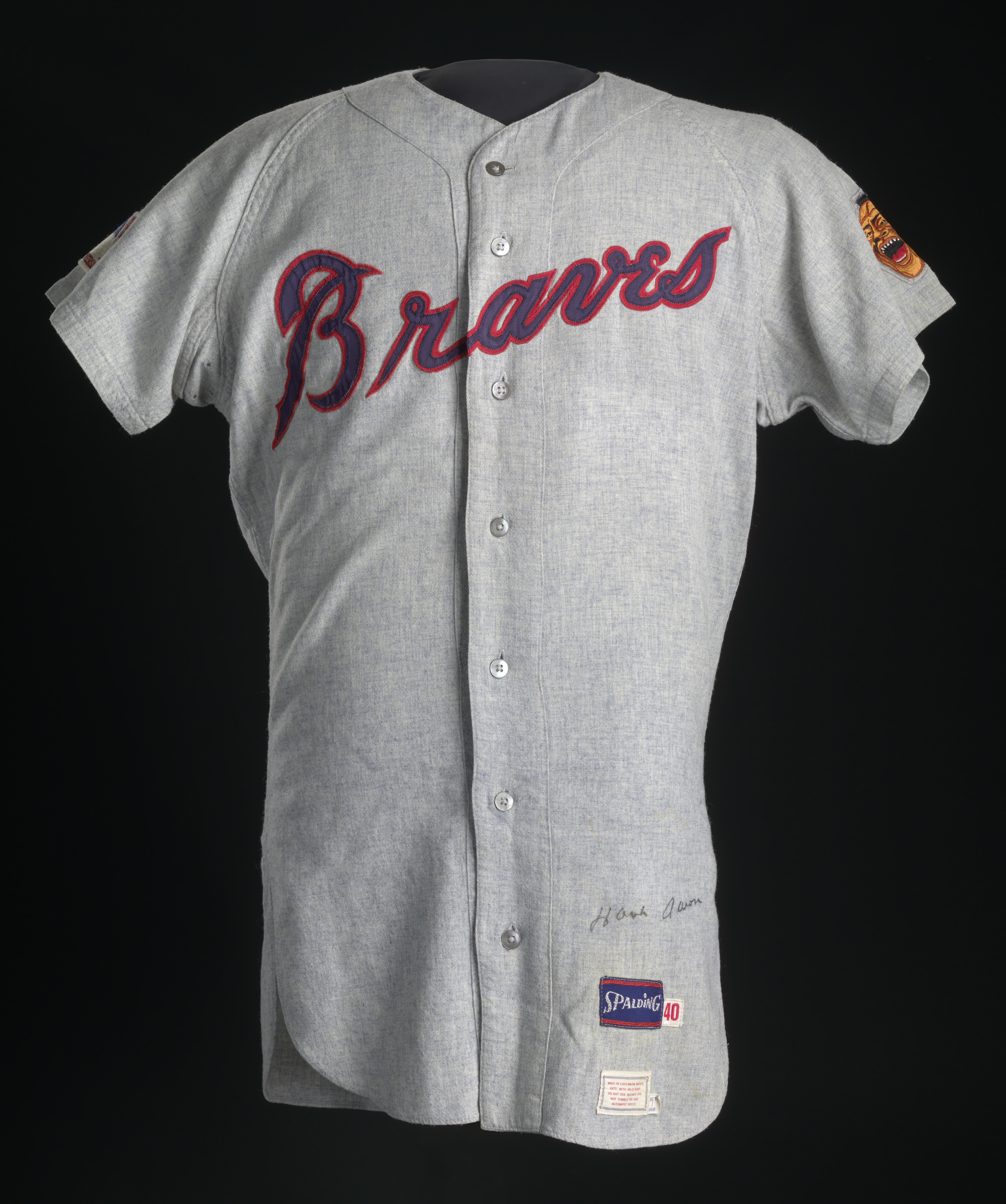
Away jersey worn by Aaron during the 1969 MLB season; MLB 100th anniversary logo (on the pictures left) was introduced that season

In 1968, Aaron became the first Atlanta Braves player to hit his 500th career home run, and in 1970, he was the first Atlanta Brave to reach 3,000 career hits. During his time in Atlanta, Aaron reached several milestones; he was only the eighth player ever to hit 500 career home runs, with his 500th coming against Mike McCormick of the San Francisco Giants on July 14, 1968—exactly one year after former Milwaukee Braves teammate Eddie Mathews had hit his 500th. Aaron was, at the time, the second-youngest player to reach the milestone. (Note: Aaron was 34 years, five months, and nine days old. Jimmie Foxx was the youngest to reach the mark at the time. Since then, Alex Rodriguez has become the youngest to reach this mark.) On July 31, 1969, Aaron hit his 537th home run, passing Mickey Mantle's total; this moved Aaron into third place on the career home run list, after Willie Mays and Babe Ruth. At the end of the 1969 season, Aaron again finished third in the MVP voting.

In 1970, Aaron reached two more career milestones. On May 17, he collected his 3,000th hit, in a game against the Cincinnati Reds, the team against which he played in his first major-league game. Aaron established the record for most seasons with 30 or more home runs in the National League. On April 27, 1971, Aaron hit his 600th career home run, the third major league player ever to do so. On July 13, Aaron hit a home run in the All-Star Game (played at Detroit's Tiger Stadium) for the first time. He hit his 40th home run of the season against the Giants' Jerry Johnson on September 10, which established a National League record for most seasons with 40 or more home runs (seven). At age 37, Aaron hit a career-high 47 home runs during the season (along with a career-high .669 slugging percentage) and finished third in MVP voting for the sixth time. During the strike-shortened season of 1972, Aaron tied and then surpassed Willie Mays for second place on the career home run list. Aaron also drove in the 2,000th run of his career and hit a home run in the first All-Star game played in Atlanta. As the year came to a close, Aaron broke Stan Musial's major-league record for total bases (6,134). He finished the season with 673 career home runs.

==== Breaking Ruth's career home run record ====
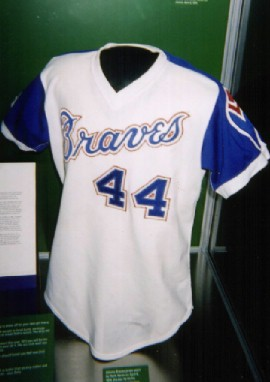
The Braves' jersey Hank Aaron wore when he broke Babe Ruth's career home run record in 1974

Aaron himself downplayed the "chase" to surpass Babe Ruth, while baseball enthusiasts and the national media grew increasingly excited as he closed in on the 714 career home runs record. Aaron received thousands of letters every week during the summer of 1973, including hate mail; he ended up asking a secretary working for the Braves, Carla Koplin, to help him sort through it.

Aaron (then age 39) hit 40 home runs in 392 at-bats, ending the 1973 season one home run short of the record. He hit home run number 713 on September 29, 1973, and with one day remaining in the season, many expected Aaron to tie the record. However, in his final game that year, playing against the Houston Astros (managed by Leo Durocher, who had once roomed with Babe Ruth), Aaron was unable to achieve this. After the game, Aaron said his only fear was that he might not live to see the 1974 season.

Aaron was the recipient of death threats and a large assortment of hate mail during the 1973–74 offseason from people who did not want to see him break Ruth's nearly sacrosanct home run record. The threats extended to those providing positive press coverage of Aaron. Lewis Grizzard, then-executive sports editor of The Atlanta Journal, reported receiving numerous phone calls calling journalists "nigger lovers" for covering Aaron's chase. While preparing the massive coverage of the home run record, Grizzard quietly had an obituary written, afraid that Aaron might be murdered.

Sports Illustrated pointedly summarized the racist vitriol that Aaron was forced to endure:

Is this to be the year in which Aaron, at the age of thirty-nine, takes a moon walk above one of the most hallowed individual records in American sport...? Or will it be remembered as the season in which Aaron, the most dignified of athletes, was besieged with hate mail and trapped by the cobwebs and goblins that lurk in baseball's attic?

At the end of the 1973 season, Aaron received a plaque from the U.S. Postal Service for receiving more mail (930,000 pieces) than any person excluding politicians. Aaron received an outpouring of public support in response to the bigotry. In August 1973, Peanuts cartoonist Charles Schulz drew a series of strips in which Snoopy attempts to break Babe Ruth's record, only to be besieged with hate mail. In the strip published August 11, Lucy remarked to Snoopy: "Hank Aaron is a great player ... but you! If you break Babe Ruth's record, it'll be a disgrace!" Coincidentally, Snoopy was only one home run short of tying the record (and finished the season as such when Charlie Brown got picked off second base during Snoopy's last at-bat), and as it turned out, Aaron finished the 1973 season one home run short of Ruth. Babe Ruth's widow, Claire, denounced the racism and declared that her husband would have enthusiastically cheered Aaron's attempt at the record. As the 1974 season began, Aaron's pursuit of the record caused a small controversy. The Braves opened the season on the road in Cincinnati with a three-game series against the Cincinnati Reds. Braves management wanted him to break the record in Atlanta and was therefore going to have Aaron sit out the first three games of the season. But Baseball Commissioner Bowie Kuhn ruled that he had to play two games in the first series. He played two out of three and tied Babe Ruth's record on April 4, 1974, in his first at-bat on his first swing of the season—off Reds pitcher Jack Billingham, but did not hit another home run in the series.

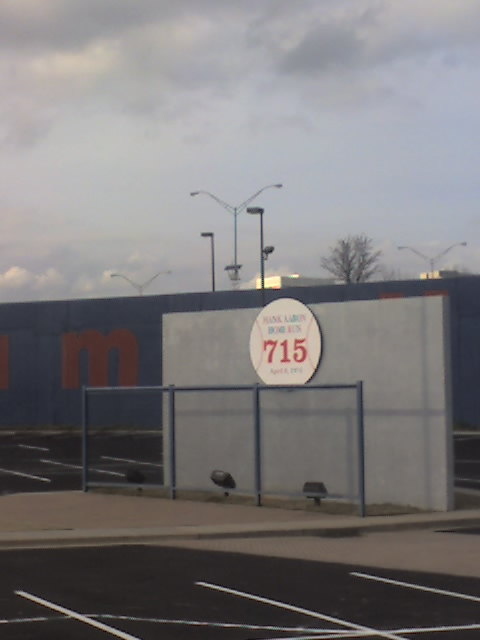
The fence over which Aaron hit his 715th career home run displayed outside of Turner Field

The Braves returned to Atlanta, and on April 8, 1974, a crowd of 53,775 people showed up for the game—a Braves attendance record. The game was also broadcast nationally on NBC. In the fourth inning, Aaron hit home run number 715 off Los Angeles Dodgers pitcher Al Downing. Although Dodgers outfielder Bill Buckner nearly went over the outfield fence trying to catch it, the ball flew into the Braves' bullpen and the First National Bank advertisement sign in left-center field, where relief pitcher Tom House caught it. While cannons were fired in celebration, two college students sprinted onto the field and jogged alongside Aaron for part of his circuit around the bases, temporarily startling him. As the fans cheered wildly, Aaron's parents ran onto the field as well. Afterwards, Aaron remarked how "I never knew my mother could hug so tight," though he later learned that Aaron's mother kept hugging him because she was worried someone could try to shoot Aaron, and she thought nobody would try to shoot him if she was hugging him. Braves announcer Milo Hamilton, calling the game on WSB radio, described the scene as Aaron broke the record:

Henry Aaron, in the second inning, walked and scored. He's sittin' on 714. Here's the pitch by Downing. Swinging. There's a drive into left-center field. That ball is gonna be-eee ... Outta here! It's gone! It's 715! There's a new home run champion of all time, and it's Henry Aaron! The fireworks are going. Henry Aaron is coming around third. His teammates are at home plate. And listen to this crowd!

Meanwhile, Dodgers broadcaster Vin Scully addressed the racial tension—or apparent lack thereof—in his call of the home run:

What a marvelous moment for baseball; what a marvelous moment for Atlanta and the state of Georgia; what a marvelous moment for the country and the world. A black man is getting a standing ovation in the Deep South for breaking a record of an all-time baseball idol. And it is a great moment for all of us, and particularly for Henry Aaron ... And for the first time in a long time, that poker face in Aaron shows the tremendous strain and relief of what it must have been like to live with for the past several months.

=== Milwaukee Brewers (1975–1976) ===
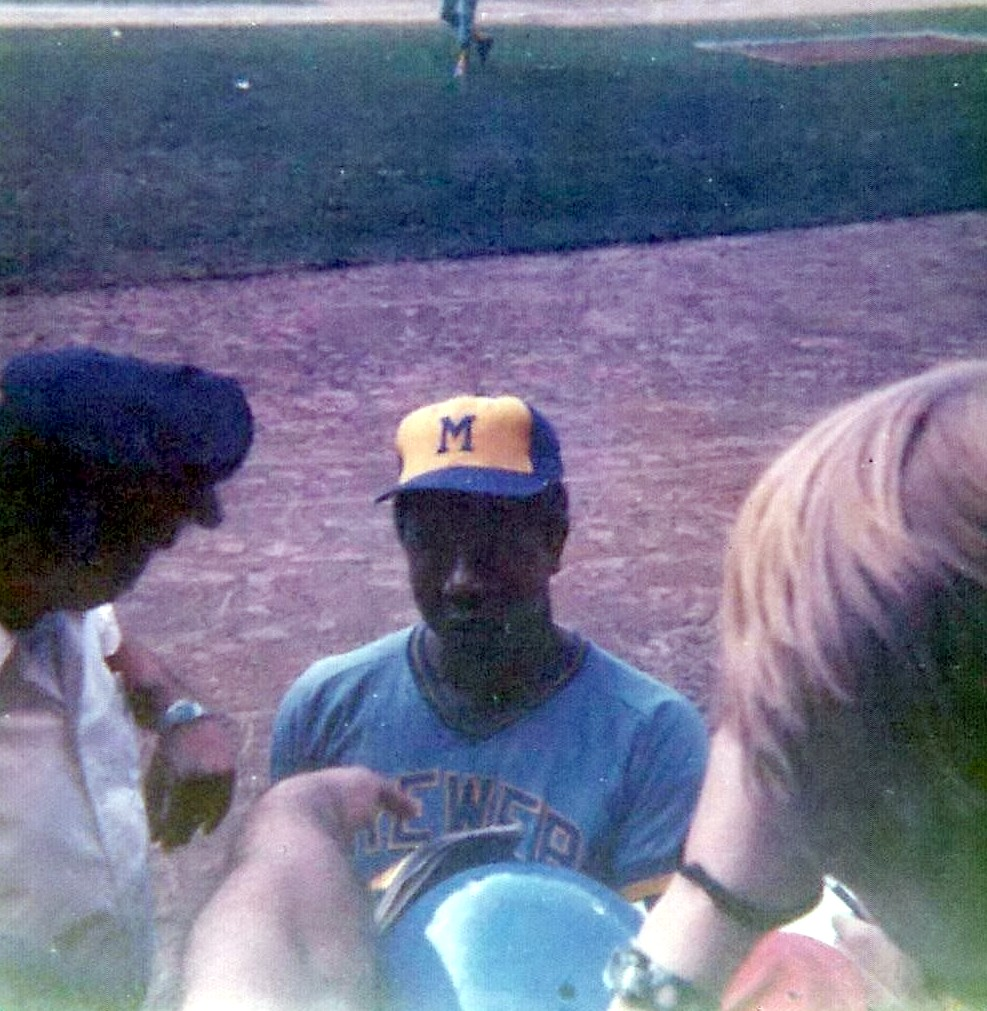
Aaron in 1975

On October 2, 1974, Aaron hit his 733rd home run in his last at-bat as a Braves player. Aaron commented after the game that it was his last time as a player in Atlanta as his contract had expired. While he considered retirement, he said that he was willing to return to baseball for another year. He had also said that he would be interested in serving as a team's general manager, someone who would make decisions and not a "house boy". The Braves offered Aaron a position with the team when he retired, but the role would be more in public relations, rather than one where he could evaluate talent.

At the end of the season, Aaron, who had a prior relationship with Brewers owner Bud Selig, requested a trade to Milwaukee. He was acquired by the Milwaukee Brewers for Dave May thirty-one days later on November 2. Minor league right-handed pitcher Roger Alexander was sent to the Braves to complete the transaction at the Winter Meetings one month later on December 2. The trade re-united Aaron with former teammate Del Crandall, who was now managing the Brewers. He signed a two-year contract with the Brewers for $240,000 per year. Playing in the American League allowed Aaron to serve as a designated hitter rather than play in the field.

On May 1, 1975, Aaron broke baseball's all-time RBI record, previously held by Ruth with 2,213. That year, he also played in his last and 24th All-Star Game (25th All-Star Game selection); he lined out to Dave Concepción as a pinch-hitter in the second inning. This All-Star Game, like the first one he played in 1955, was before a home crowd at Milwaukee County Stadium.

Aaron hit his 755th and final home run on July 20, 1976, at Milwaukee County Stadium off Dick Drago of the California Angels, which stood as the MLB career home run record for 31 years until it was broken in 2007 by Barry Bonds. Over the course of his record-breaking 23-year career, Aaron had a batting average of .305 and 164 hits a season, while averaging nearly 33 home runs and 100 RBIs a year. He had 100+ RBIs in a season 11 times, including 5 years in a row between 1959 and 1963.

== Career overall ==
For his career, Aaron batted .305 with 3771 hits, including 624 doubles, 98 triples, and 755 home runs. In 17 postseason games, including two World Series (1957, '58) and the 1969 NLCS, Aaron batted .362 (25-for-69) with 11 runs scored, 4 doubles, 1 triple, 6 home runs, 16 RBI, 5 walks, on-base percentage of .405, slugging percentage of .710, and on-base plus slugging percentage of 1.116.

=== Statistics and achievements ===
Legend
**Bold**	All-time leader

Category	Years	WAR	G	AB	R	H	2B	3B	HR	TB	XBH	RBI	SB	BB	AVG	OBP	SLG	OPS	FLG%	Ref.
Total	23	143.2	3,298	12,364	2,174	3,771	624	98	755	**6,856**	**1,477**	**2,297**	240	1,402	.305	.374	.555	.928	.982	

== Post-playing career ==
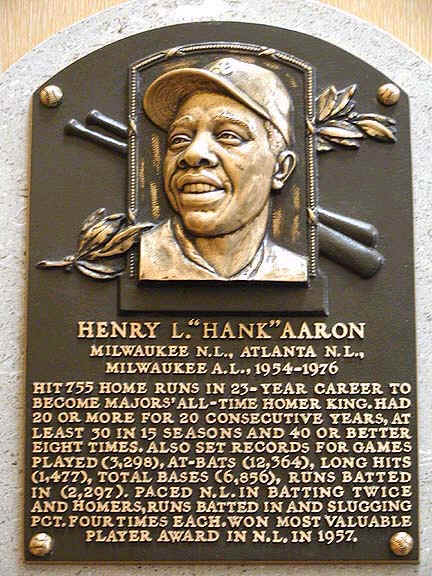
Hank Aaron's Hall of Fame plaque at the Baseball Hall of Fame in Cooperstown, New York

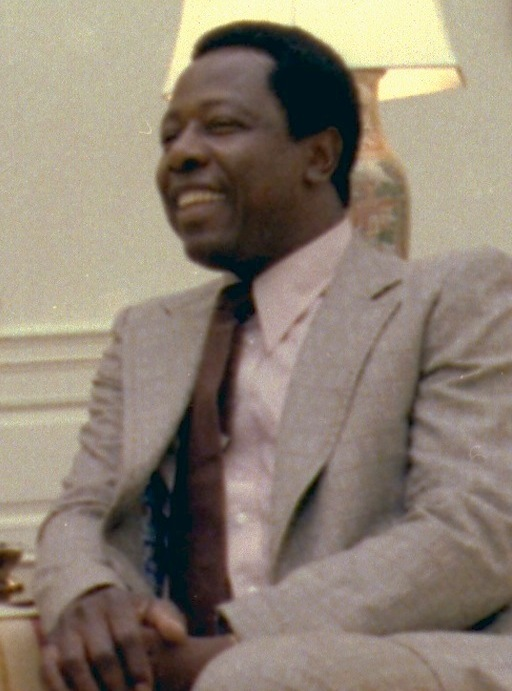
Aaron during his August 5, 1978, visit to the White House

After the 1976 season, Aaron rejoined the Braves as an executive. On August 1, 1982, he was inducted into the Baseball Hall of Fame, having received votes on 97.8 percent of the ballots, second only to Ty Cobb, who had received votes on 98.2% of the ballot in the inaugural 1936 Hall of Fame election. Aaron was then named the Braves' vice president and director of player development. This made him one of the first minorities in Major League Baseball upper-level management.

In December 1980, Aaron became senior vice president and assistant to the Braves' president. He was the corporate vice president of community relations for Turner Broadcasting System, a member of the company's board of directors, and the vice president of business development for The Airport Network. On January 21, 2007, Major League Baseball announced the sale of the Atlanta Braves. In that announcement, Baseball Commissioner Bud Selig also announced that Aaron would be playing a major role in the management of the Braves, forming programs through major league baseball that will encourage the influx of minorities into baseball. Aaron founded the Hank Aaron Rookie League program.

Shortly before the start of the 2002 baseball season, Aaron joined San Francisco Giants slugger Barry Bonds—on the heels of his record-shattering performance the season before—to make a television commercial that aired during Super Bowl XXXVI, in which Aaron jokingly tried to persuade Bonds to retire before breaking the record.

As Bonds began to close in on the record during the 2007 season, Aaron let it be known that, although he recognized Bonds' achievements, he would not be present when Bonds broke the record. There was considerable speculation that this was a snubbing of Bonds based on the widespread belief that Bonds had used performance-enhancing drugs and steroids to aid his achievement. However, some observers looked back on Aaron's personal history, pointing out that he had downplayed his own breaking of Babe Ruth's all-time record and suggesting Aaron was simply treating Bonds in a similar fashion. In a later interview with Atlanta sportscasting personality Chris Dimino, Aaron made it clear his reluctance to attend any celebration of a new home run record was based upon his personal conviction that baseball is not about breaking records, but simply playing to the best of one's potential. After Bonds hit his record-breaking 756th home run on August 7, 2007, Aaron made a surprise appearance on the JumboTron video screen at AT&T Park in San Francisco to congratulate Bonds on his accomplishment:

I would like to offer my congratulations to Barry Bonds on becoming baseball's career home run leader. It is a great accomplishment that required skill, longevity, and determination. Throughout the past century, the home run has held a special place in baseball and I have been privileged to hold this record for 33 of those years. I move over now and offer my best wishes to Barry and his family on this historical achievement. My hope today, as it was on that April evening in 1974, is that the achievement of this record will inspire others to chase their own dreams.

Aaron's autobiography, I Had A Hammer, co-written with the help of writer Lonnie Wheeler, was published in 1990 and was a finalist for the Casey Award. The book's title is a play on his nickname, "The Hammer" or "Hammerin' Hank", and the title of the folk song "If I Had a Hammer". Aaron owned Hank Aaron BMW of south Atlanta in Union City, Georgia, where he included an autographed baseball with every car sold. Aaron also owned Mini, Land Rover, Toyota, Hyundai, and Honda dealerships throughout Georgia, as part of the Hank Aaron Automotive Group. Aaron sold all but the Toyota dealership in McDonough in 2007. Additionally, Aaron owned a chain of 30 restaurants around the country.

== Personal life ==
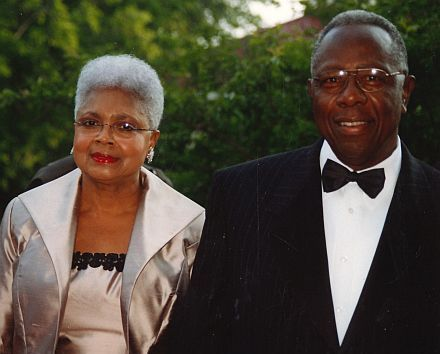
Aaron (right) with his second wife, Billye

Aaron's first marriage was to Barbara Lucas in 1953. They had five children: Gary, Lary, Dorinda, Gaile, and Hank Jr. He divorced Barbara in 1971 and married Billye Suber Williams on November 13, 1973. Aaron adopted Billye's daughter, Ceci, from her first marriage to civil rights activist Samuel Woodrow Williams.

Despite being publicly and professionally known as "Hank," Aaron preferred to go by his given name, "Henry." The former name came around when Don Davidson, the public relations director for the Milwaukee Braves, began to refer to him as such in an effort to make the quiet, soft-spoken player seem more accessible to the fans and the press.

Aaron's great-nephew, Kimani Vidal, was selected by the Los Angeles Chargers in the 2024 NFL draft. His sister Alfredia, Vidal's grandmother, married U.S. Representative David Scott in 1969.

=== Religion ===
Born and raised a Baptist, Aaron converted to Catholicism in 1959 at age 25, together with his family. He and his wife first became interested in the faith after the birth of their first child, whom they baptized immediately. A friendship with a priest later helped lead to Hank and his wife's conversion. Aaron was known to frequently read Thomas à Kempis' 15th-century book The Imitation of Christ, which he kept in his locker.

In an interview in 1991, Aaron credited the priest, Fr. Michael Sablica, with helping him grow as a person in the 1950s. "He taught me what life was all about. But he was more than just a religious friend of mine, he was a friend because he talked as if he was not a priest sometimes." Active in the civil rights movement, the priest encouraged Aaron to be more publicly vocal about causes he believed in.

Sablica also encouraged him to "attend Mass every Sunday" during Spring Training, to which he responded with the racist realities of the day: "[In Bradenton], they won't let me go to Mass." Sablica said in an interview that he wouldn't have blamed Aaron if he stopped practicing. Aaron indeed attended Friendship Baptist Church toward the end of his life, noting in his autobiography that he didn't remain a practicing Catholic for very long after converting.

=== Hobbies and health ===
Aaron was a longtime fan of the Cleveland Browns, having attended many games in disguise in their "Dawg Pound" seating section.

In 1980, Aaron made a guest appearance on Happy Days episode "The Hucksters". In 1986, he made a guest appearance in "Just Another Fox in the Crowd", episode 30 of Crazy Like a Fox.

In 1994, Aaron and his wife established the Chasing the Dream Foundation which awarded the Hank Aaron Chasing The Dream Scholarship to members of the Boys & Girls Clubs of America.

Aaron lived in the Atlanta area. In July 2013, media reported that his home was burglarized with jewelry and two BMW vehicles having been stolen. The cars were later recovered.

Aaron suffered from arthritis and had a partial hip replacement after a fall in 2014.

On January 5, 2021, Aaron publicly received a COVID-19 vaccination with the Moderna COVID-19 vaccine at the Morehouse School of Medicine at Atlanta, Georgia. He and several other Black American public figures, including activist Joe Beasley, Andrew Young, and Louis Sullivan, did so to demonstrate the safety of the vaccine and encourage other Black Americans to do the same.

== Death ==
On January 22, 2021, Aaron died in his sleep at his Atlanta residence at age 86. The manner of death was listed as natural causes. His funeral was held five days later at the Friendship Baptist Church. Amongst the attendees were former President Bill Clinton, former baseball commissioner Bud Selig, and former Atlanta mayor Andrew Young. After the funeral, Aaron's body was interred at South-View Cemetery in Atlanta.

=== Tributes ===
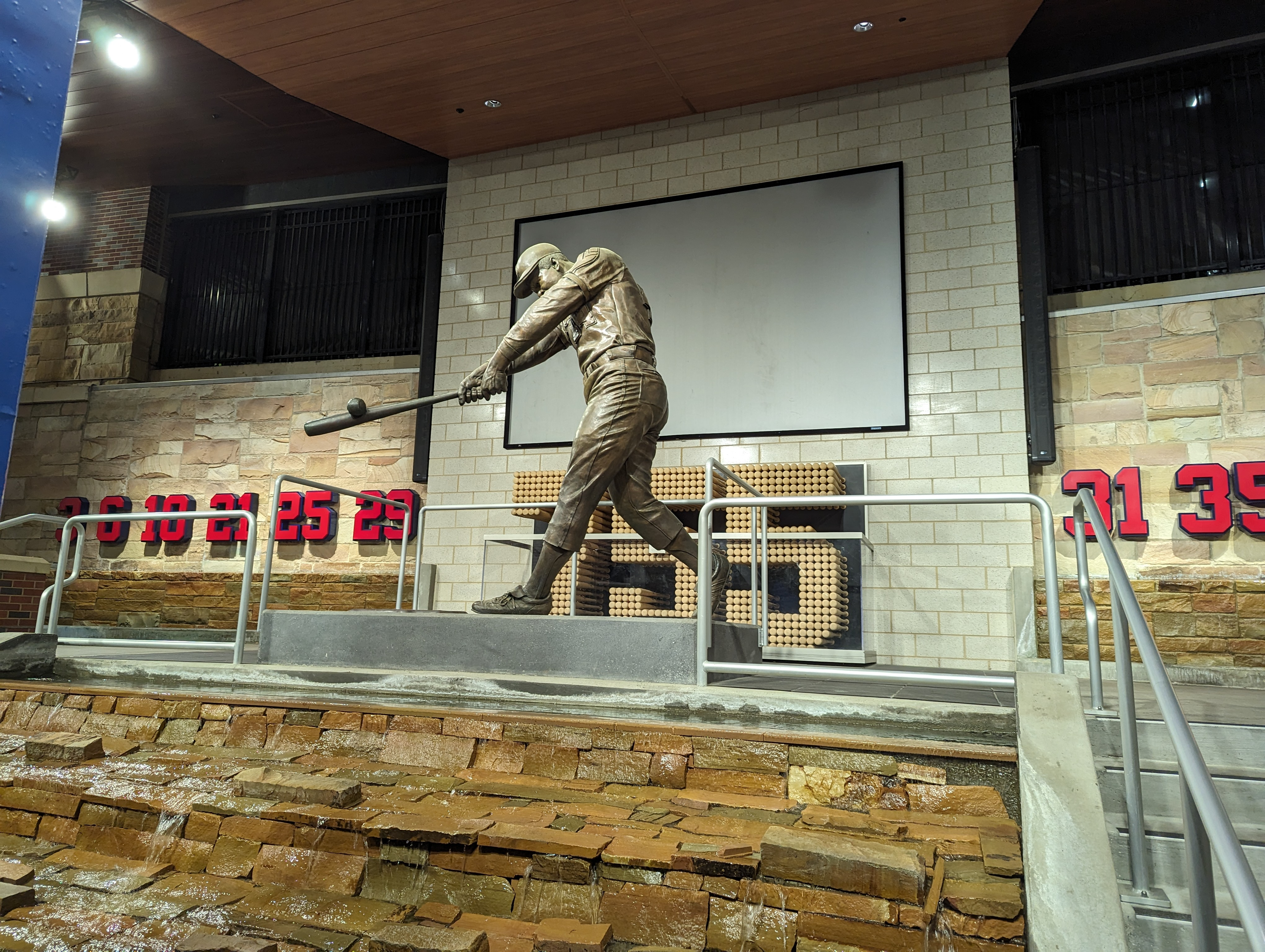
A large statue of Aaron inside Truist Park in Metro Atlanta. The piece is the centerpiece of the stadium's exhibit on the history of the Atlanta Braves; the number 755 behind the statue refers to Aaron's homerun record.

Upon Aaron's death, the sports world expressed their condolences to him. Many current or former athletes and team owners such as MLB Commissioner Rob Manfred, Magic Johnson, David Ortiz, Dusty Baker, Eduardo Pérez, Mike Trout, and Baseball Hall of Fame chairman Jane Forbes Clark paid tribute to Aaron. Fans paid tribute to him by placing flowers in front of the home run wall where he hit his 715th home run at the former site of Atlanta–Fulton County Stadium and in front of his statue at Truist Park.

Politicians also paid tribute to him. The Mayor of Atlanta, Keisha Lance Bottoms released the following statement on his death:

"Derek, our family and I join the nation in sending heartfelt condolences to Mrs. Billye Aaron, the beautiful wife of Henry "Hank" Aaron for nearly 50 years, and the entire family. This is a considerable loss for the entire city of Atlanta. While the world knew him as ‘Hammering Hank Aaron’ because of his incredible, record-setting baseball career, he was a cornerstone of our village, graciously and freely joining Mrs. Aaron in giving their presence and resources toward making our city a better place. As an adopted son of Atlanta, Mr. Aaron was part of the fabric that helped place Atlanta on the world stage. Our gratitude, thoughts and prayers are with the Aaron family."

Georgia governor Brian Kemp ordered flags in the state of Georgia to be lowered half-staff in honor of him.

U.S. President Joe Biden paid tribute to Aaron by releasing a statement calling him "an American hero". Aaron also received tributes from former presidents Jimmy Carter, Bill Clinton, George W. Bush, and Barack Obama.

The Atlanta Braves honored Hank Aaron during the 2021 season by including his jersey number 44 on the back of the team caps along with Phil Niekro's jersey number, 35 (who died one month earlier in December 2020). They also painted 44 in the midfield at Truist Park.

At Game 3 of the 2021 World Series in Truist Park, a pregame ceremony was held honoring Aaron where his son, Hank Jr., threw out a ceremonial first pitch. After the Braves won the 2021 World Series, Aaron was honored in the design of the team's World Series championship ring, which includes 755 total diamonds to commemorate Aaron's career home runs, and 44 emerald-cut diamonds to represent Aaron's jersey number with the Braves.

At the 2025 Major League Baseball All-Star Game, right after the sixth inning, a special tribute to Aaron's 715th home run was played, featuring special effects and a projector screening clips from the original NBC broadcast of the milestone on the field, featuring audio from both Vin Scully of that network, and Milo Hamilton from radio station WSB. A firework was shot through out of the ballpark at left field, with Hamilton calling out the milestone calls, while one of the mini scoreboards projects a recreation of the number "715" that was used at the old Atlanta–Fulton County Stadium. A spotlight was used as a special tribute afterward.

== Awards and honors ==
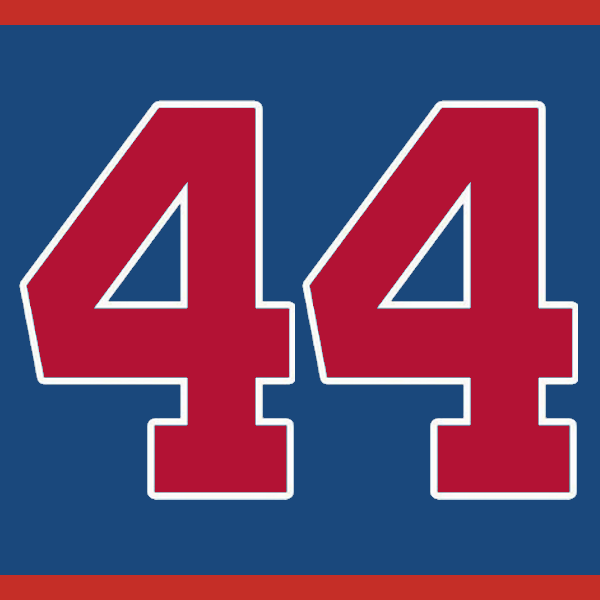
Hank Aaron's number 44 was retired by the Atlanta Braves in 1977.

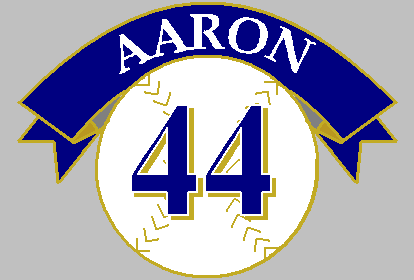
Hank Aaron's number 44 was retired by the Milwaukee Brewers in 1976.

In 1982, Aaron was inducted into the Baseball Hall of Fame during his first year of eligibility.

Aaron was awarded the Spingarn Medal in 1976, from the NAACP. In 1977, Aaron received the American Academy of Achievement's Golden Plate Award. In 1988, Aaron was inducted into the Wisconsin Athletic Hall of Fame for his time spent on the Eau Claire Bears, Milwaukee Braves, and Milwaukee Brewers.

In 1999, Major League Baseball created the Hank Aaron Award, to commemorate the 25th anniversary of Aaron's surpassing of Babe Ruth's career home run mark of 714 home runs and to honor Aaron's contributions to baseball. The award is given annually to the baseball hitters voted the most effective in each respective league. In 2002, scholar Molefi Kete Asante listed Aaron on his list of 100 Greatest African Americans.

When the city of Atlanta was converting Centennial Olympic Stadium into a new baseball stadium, many local residents hoped the stadium would be named for Aaron. When the stadium was instead named Turner Field (after Atlanta Braves owner Ted Turner), a section of Capitol Avenue running past the stadium was renamed Hank Aaron Drive. The stadium's street number is 755, after Aaron's total number of home runs; the 755 street number was retained for Turner Field's replacement, Truist Park. In April 1997, a new baseball facility for the AA Mobile Bay Bears constructed in Aaron's hometown of Mobile, Alabama was named Hank Aaron Stadium. Georgia State University acquired Turner Field and has since rebuilt it as Center Parc Stadium, in 2017, and university officials plan to build a new baseball park on the former Atlanta–Fulton County Stadium site, incorporating the left field wall where Aaron hit his record-breaking home run.

On February 5, 1999, at his 65th birthday celebration, Major League Baseball announced the introduction of the Hank Aaron Award. The award honors the best overall offensive performer in the American and National League. It was the first major award to be introduced in more than thirty years and had the distinction of being the first award named after a player who was still alive. Later that year, he ranked fifth on The Sporting News' list of the 100 Greatest Baseball Players, and was elected to the Major League Baseball All-Century Team.

In June 2000, Tufts University awarded Aaron an honorary Doctor of Public Service. In July 2000 and again in July 2002, Aaron threw out the ceremonial first pitch at the Major League Baseball All-Star Game, played at Turner Field and Miller Park now named American Family Field, respectively.

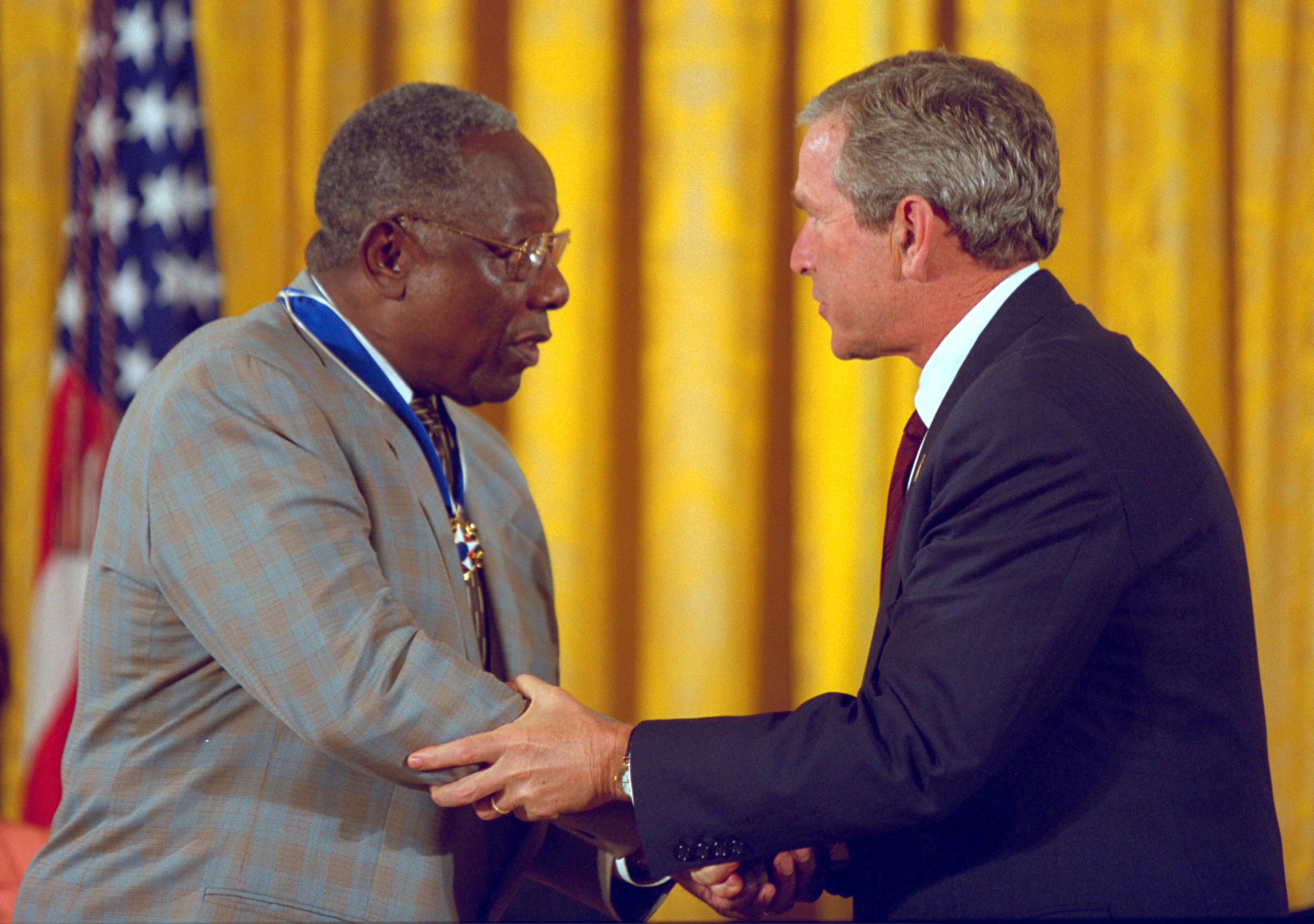
Aaron accepting the Presidential Medal of Freedom from President George W. Bush in 2002

On January 8, 2001, Aaron was presented with the Presidential Citizens Medal by President Bill Clinton. He received the Presidential Medal of Freedom, the nation's highest civilian honor, from President George W. Bush in June 2002. In 2001, a recreational trail in Milwaukee connecting American Family Field with Lake Michigan along the Menomonee River was dedicated as the Hank Aaron State Trail. Aaron attended the dedication. Aaron was on the Board of Selectors of Jefferson Awards for Public Service.

In 2002, Aaron was honored with the "Lombardi Award of Excellence" from the Vince Lombardi Cancer Foundation. The award was created to honor Vince Lombardi's legacy and is awarded annually to an individual who exemplifies the spirit of the coach.

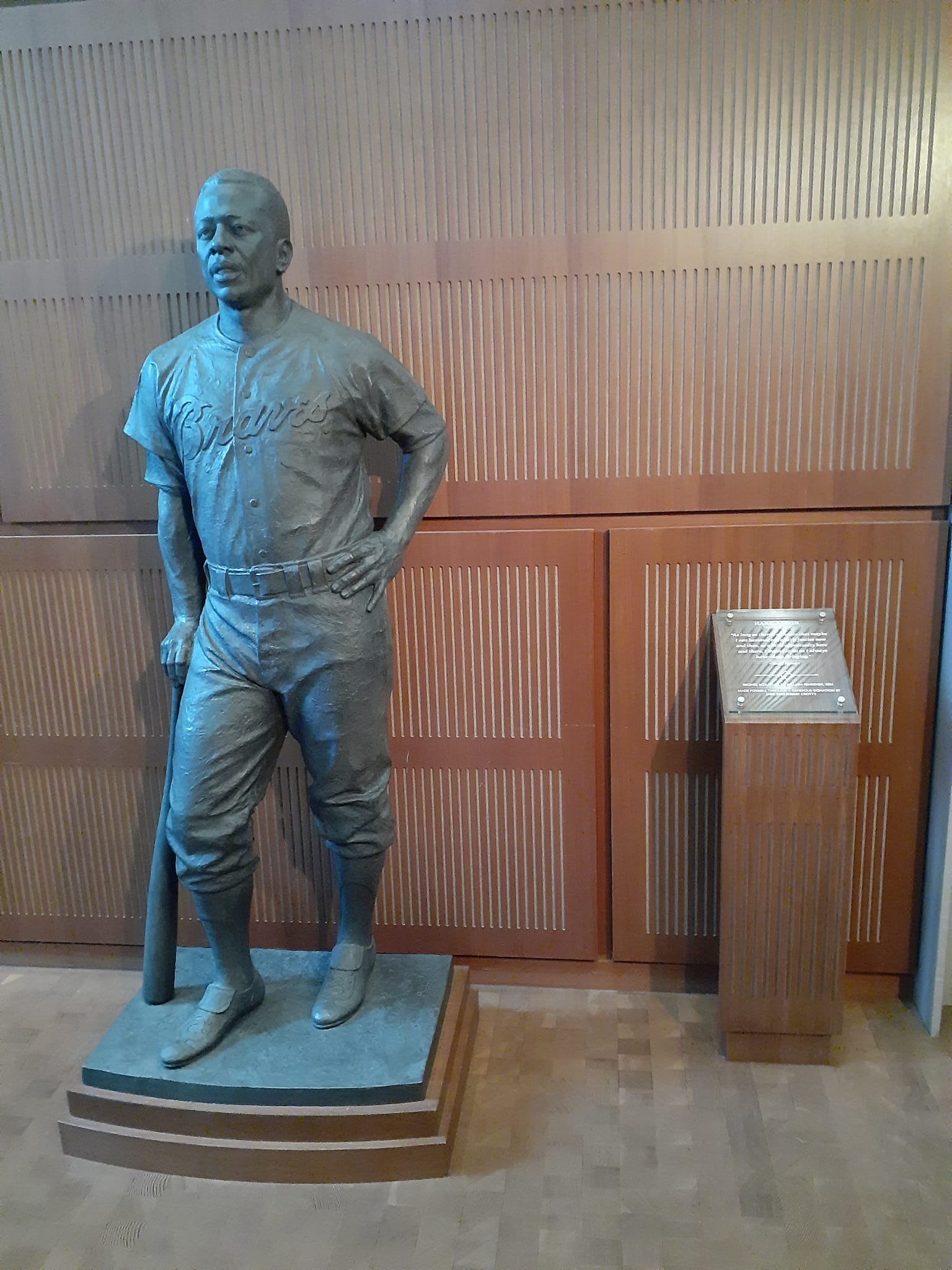
A commemorative statue of Hank Aaron on display in the lobby at the National Baseball Hall of Fame in Cooperstown, NY.

Aaron dedicated the new exhibit "Hank Aaron: Chasing the Dream" at the Baseball Hall of Fame on April 25, 2009. Statues of Aaron stand outside the front entrance of both Turner Field and American Family Field. There is also a statue of him as an 18-year-old shortstop outside Carson Park in Eau Claire, Wisconsin, where he played his first season in the Braves' minor league system.

He was named a 2010 Georgia Trustee by the Georgia Historical Society, in conjunction with the Governor of Georgia, to recognize accomplishments and community service that reflect the ideals of the founding body of Trustees, which governed the Georgia colony from 1732 to 1752.

In 2011, the President of Princeton University Shirley M. Tilghman awarded an honorary Doctor of Humanities degree to Aaron.

In November 2015, Aaron was one of the five inaugural recipients of the Portrait of a Nation Prize, an award granted by the National Portrait Gallery in recognition of "exemplary achievements in the fields of civil rights, business, entertainment, science, and sports."

In January 2016, Aaron received the Order of the Rising Sun, Gold Rays with Rosette from Akihito, the Emperor of Japan.

The Elite Development Invitational, a youth baseball tournament organized by the Major League Baseball and the MLB Players Association to increase diversity in the sport, was renamed the Hank Aaron Invitational for the 2019 season.

After Aaron's death, the Atlanta Falcons of the NFL and Atlanta United of MLS retired his No. 44 for the 2021 season (the Atlanta Hawks of the NBA had already retired No. 44 for Pete Maravich). Additionally, Gwinnett County minor league baseball teams, the Triple-A Gwinnett Stripers (2021 season) and Double-A Atlanta Gladiators (2021–22 season), also temporarily retired No. 44 in Aaron's honor, as did the Braves' other minor league affiliates.

In April 2021, the Forrest Hill Academy was renamed the Hank Aaron New Beginnings Academy. The alternative high school had been named after Nathan Bedford Forrest, a general in the Confederate Army and the Ku Klux Klan's first Grand Wizard.

In 2022, a recording of the WSB broadcast of the April 8, 1974, Braves–Dodgers game in which Aaron hit his 715th home run was selected by the Library of Congress for preservation in the National Recording Registry. In May of the same year, Tulane University gave Aaron a posthumous honorary degree of Doctor of Humane Letters, the first posthumous honorary degree ever awarded by the university. It was presented during the university's unified commencement ceremony and was accepted on his behalf by his widow Billye.

On July 31, 2024, the USPS released a stamp honoring Aaron. In 2024, several Hank Aaron memorabilia items were sold at Heritage Auctions including his game-used bats, jerseys and baseball cards.

== See also ==
- Aaron Monument
- Henry Aaron Field
- Major League Baseball titles leaders
- Ruth–Aaron pair
- List of Gold Glove Award winners at outfield
- List of Major League Baseball annual doubles leaders
- List of Major League Baseball annual home run leaders
- List of Major League Baseball annual runs batted in leaders
- List of Major League Baseball annual runs scored leaders
- List of Major League Baseball batting champions
- List of Major League Baseball career doubles leaders
- List of Major League Baseball career hits leaders
- List of Major League Baseball career extra base hits leaders
- List of Major League Baseball career home run leaders
- List of Major League Baseball career runs batted in leaders
- List of Major League Baseball career runs scored leaders
- List of Major League Baseball career total bases leaders
- List of Major League Baseball career triples leaders
- List of Major League Baseball career slugging percentage leaders
- List of Major League Baseball doubles records
- List of Major League Baseball home run records
- List of Major League Baseball individual streaks
- List of Major League Baseball runs batted in records
- List of Negro league baseball players who played in Major League Baseball

== Book sources ==
- Aaron, Henry; Wheeler, Lonnie (1990). I Had A Hammer: The Hank Aaron Story. HarperCollins. ISBN 978-0061873379.
- Stanton, Tom (2005). Hank Aaron and the Home Run That Changed America. Perennial Currents. ISBN 978-0-06-072290-6.
- Vascellaro, Charlie (2005). Hank Aaron: A Biography. Greenwood Publishing Group. ISBN 978-0-313-33001-8.
- Bryant, Howard (2010). The Last Hero: A Life of Henry Aaron (1st ed.). New York: Pantheon Books. ISBN 978-0375424854.

Achievements
Preceded by Babe Ruth	Career home run record holders 1974–2007	Succeeded by Barry Bonds
Awards
Preceded by Willie Mays; Roberto Clemente	Major League Baseball Player of the Month; May 1959 (with Harvey Haddix); June 1967	Succeeded by Roy Face; Jim Ray Hart
