= Sparkman School District =

Defunct school district in Arkansas, United States

Sparkman School District No. 4 or the Sparkman School System was a school district headquartered in Sparkman, Arkansas.

Its schools were Sparkman Elementary School and Sparkman High School.

== History ==
In 1965 the Dallas County School District dissolved, with a portion of the students going to the Sparkman school district.

By 2004 new laws were passed requiring school districts with enrollments below 350 to consolidate with other school districts. Sparkman was one of several districts that were unable to find another district willing to consolidate with it, so the Arkansas Board of Education was to forcibly consolidate it. On July 1, 2004, it consolidated into the Harmony Grove School District of Camden.
