= John Taylor (archivist) =

American military archivist (1921 - 2008)

John Edward Taylor
- Born: 1921; Sparkman, Arkansas
- Died: September 20, 2008 (aged 86–87); Chevy Chase, Maryland
- Education: University of Arkansas
- Occupation: Military archivist for the National Archives and Records Administration

John Edward Taylor (1921 – 20 September 2008) was an American military archivist at the National Archives and Records Administration for 63 years.

== Life and career ==
Taylor was born in Sparkman, Arkansas and graduated from the University of Arkansas in 1945. He was frequently acknowledged by authors for his assistance, and the National Archives named its collection of intelligence and espionage books in his honor. Taylor died of congestive heart failure at his home in Chevy Chase, Maryland.
