= Aaron Monument =

Statue in Milwaukee, Wisconsin, U.S.

- Artist: Brian Maughan
- Year: 2001
- Type: bronze
- Dimensions: 210 cm (84 in)
- Location: American Family Field; Milwaukee, Wisconsin; 43°1′44.4″N 87°58′21.36″W

The Aaron Monument is a public art work by artist Brian Maughan. It is located in front of the American Family Field stadium west of downtown Milwaukee, Wisconsin, United States.

== Description ==
The sculpture depicts Hank Aaron, a member of the Milwaukee Brewers baseball team, in a batting stance. The figure wears the uniform of the winners of the 1957 World Series: long socks, loose-fitting knee-length pants, a button-front short-sleeved jersey and a cap. The sculpture was dedicated on April 5, 2001.
