= Sardis Methodist Church =

Historic church in Arkansas, United States

- U.S. National Register of Historic Places
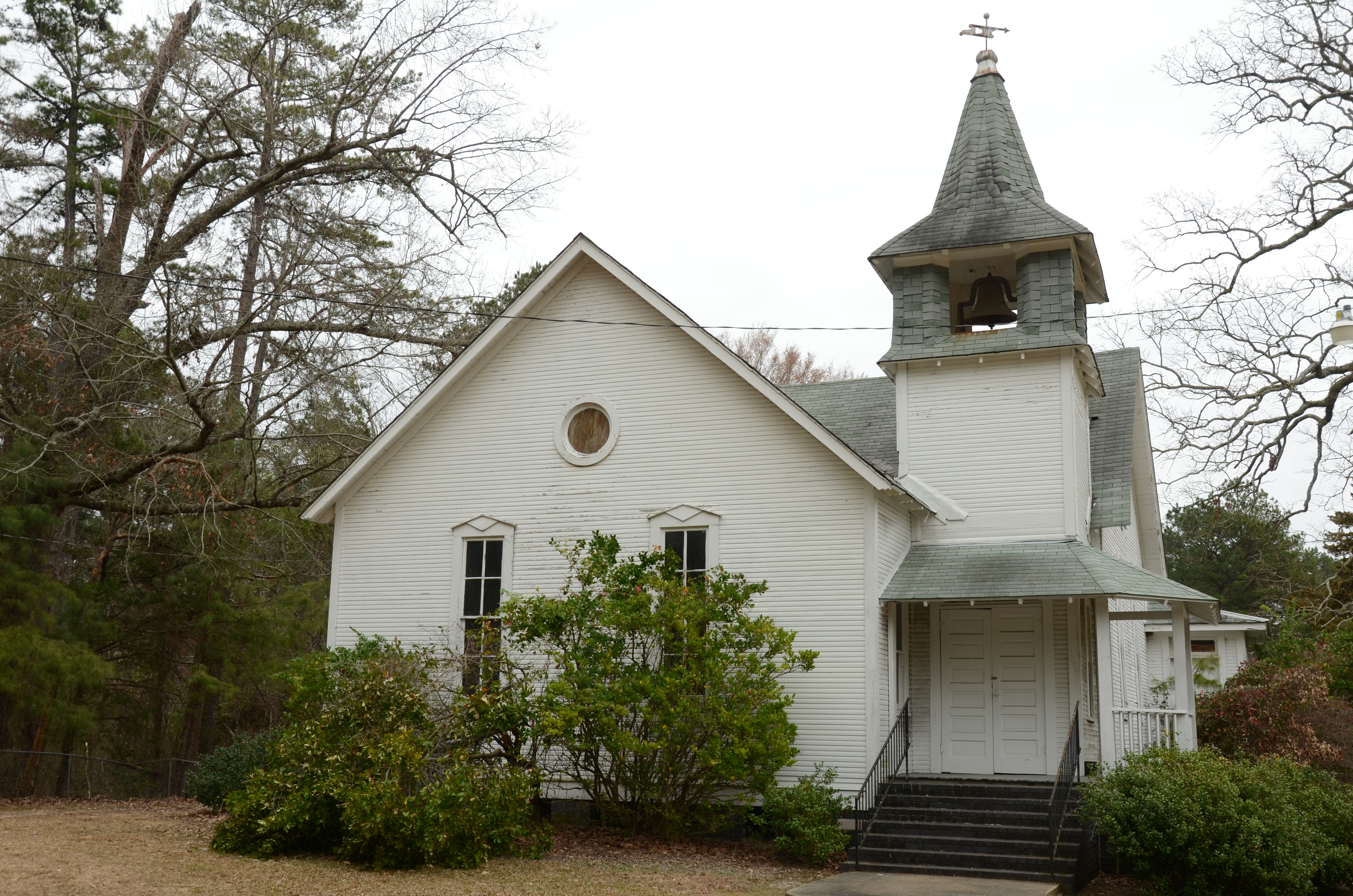
- Front view

- Location within Arkansas Location within the United States
- Location: NE of Pine Grove off AR 128, Sparkman, Arkansas
- Coordinates: 33°53′42″N 92°46′9″W
- Area: less than one acre
- Built: 1895
- MPS: Dallas County MRA
- NRHP reference No.: 83003540
- Added to NRHP: October 28, 1983

Sardis Methodist Church is a historic church northeast of Pine Grove off Arkansas Highway 128 in Sparkman, Arkansas. The single-story wood-frame church was built c. 1895, and is a well-preserved example of a vernacular rural church in Dallas County. The building features a cross-gable roof, an unusual configuration not seen on most of the county's rural churches, and has a pyramid-roofed tower with open belfry at its southwest corner.

The building was listed on the National Register of Historic Places in 1983.

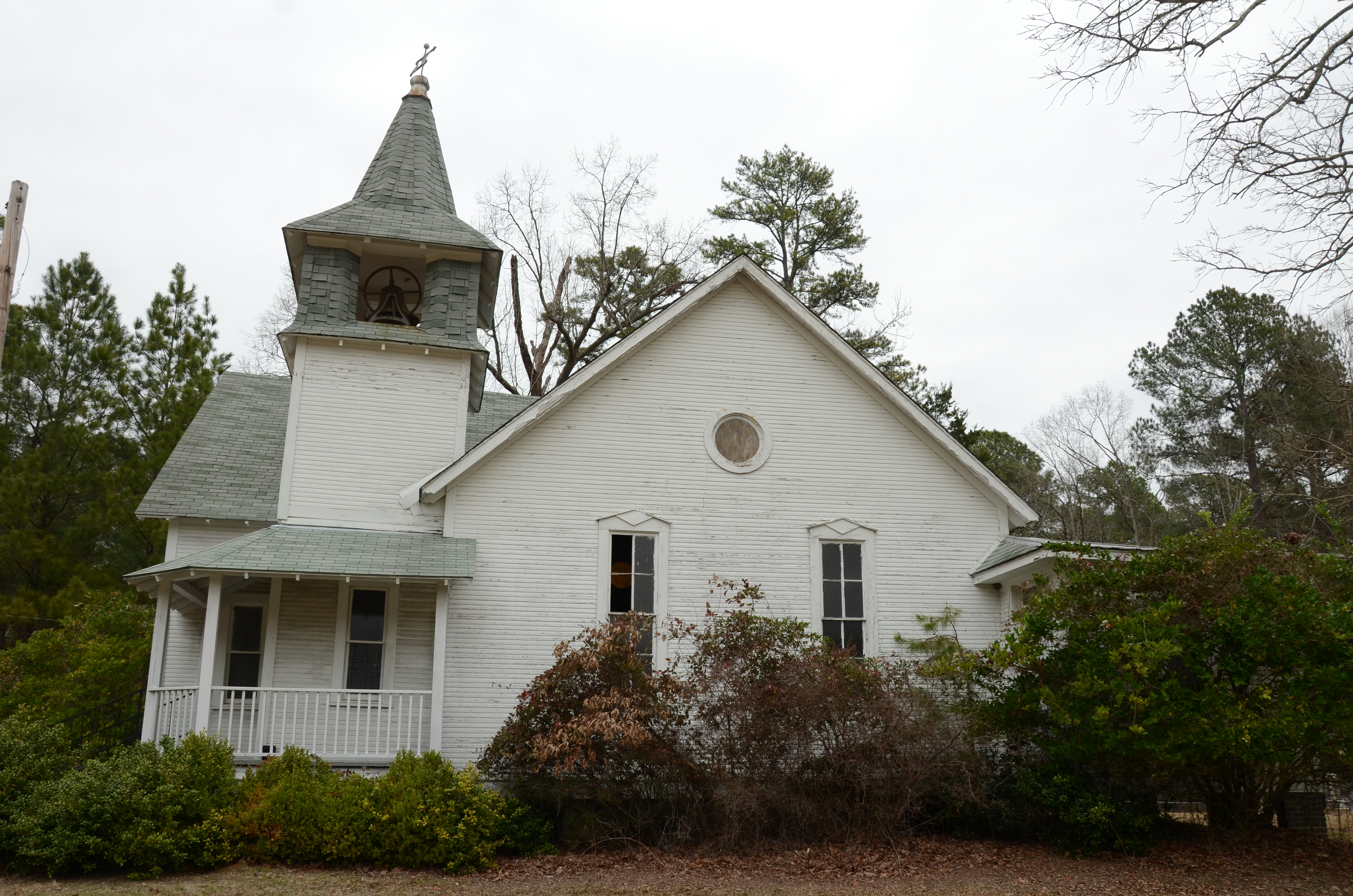
Side view

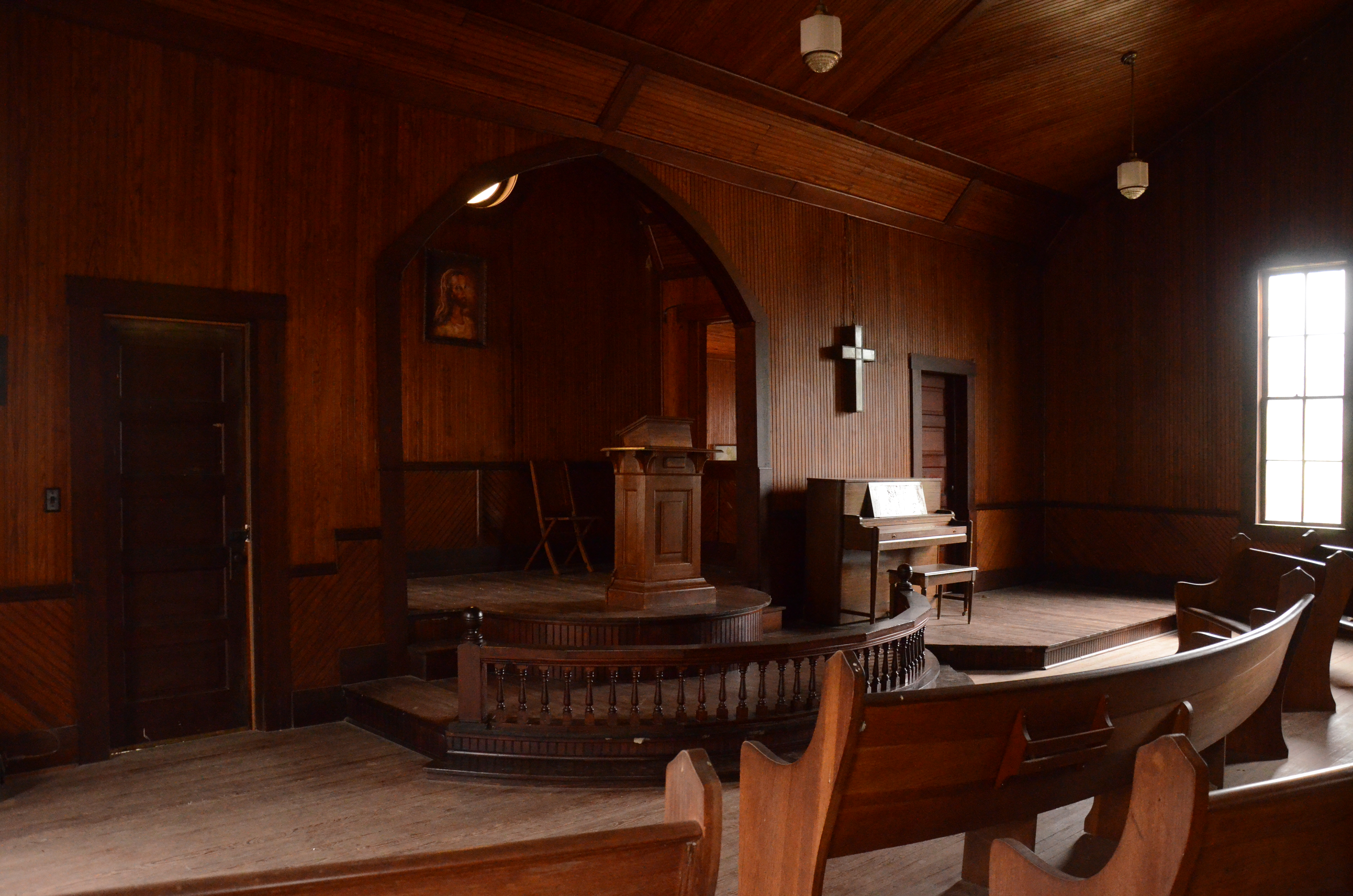
Interior

== See also ==
- National Register of Historic Places listings in Dallas County, Arkansas
