= Sparkman (surname) =

Sparkman is a surname. Notable people with the surname include:

- Alan Sparkman (1926–2010), American football player
- Glenn Sparkman (born 1992), American baseball pitcher
- John Sparkman (1899–1985), American jurist and politician
- Stephen M. Sparkman (1849–1929), American politician
- Wiley Sparkman (1906–1995), American politician
