= Sparkman High School (Arkansas) =

Location
- 325 West Main Street; Sparkman, Arkansas 71763; United States
- Coordinates: 33°54′58″N 92°51′5″W

Information
- School type: Public comprehensive
- Status: Open
- School district: Harmony Grove School District
- CEEB code: 042305
- NCES School ID: 050729001016
- Teaching staff: 10.45 (on FTE basis)
- Grades: 7–12
- Enrollment: 95 (2010–11)
- Student to teacher ratio: 9.09
- Education system: ADE Smart Core
- Classes offered: Regular (Core), Career Focus, Advanced Placement (AP)
- Colors: Purple and gold
- Athletics conference: 1A 7 East (2012–14)
- Mascot: Raider
- Team name: Sparkman Raiders
- Accreditation: ADE
- Feeder to: Sparkman Elementary School
- Affiliation: Arkansas Activities Association
- Website: www.hgsd1.com/5643

Sparkman High School is a comprehensive public high school located in Sparkman, Arkansas, United States. The school provides secondary education in grades 7 through 12 for approximately 100 students. It is one of two public high schools in Dallas County and is one of two high schools administered by the (Camden) Harmony Grove School District, which is based in Ouachita County.

It was previously a part of the Sparkman School District. On July 1, 2004, the district consolidated into the Harmony Grove district.

== Academics ==
The assumed course of study is the Smart Core curriculum developed by the Arkansas Department of Education. Students may engage in regular (core and career focus) courses and exams and may select Advanced Placement (AP) coursework and exams that provide an opportunity for college credit prior to graduation. Sparkman High School is accredited by ADE.

== Athletics ==
The Sparkman High School mascot and athletic emblem is the Raider with school colors of purple and gold.

The Sparkman Raiders compete in interscholastic activities within the 1A Classification administered by the Arkansas Activities Association. The Raiders play within the 1A 7 East Conference. The Raiders participate in basketball (boys/girls), cheer, baseball, fastpitch softball, and track and field (boys/girls).
