= Harmony Grove School District (Ouachita County, Arkansas) =

School district in Arkansas

Location
- 401 Ouachita Road 88; Camden, Arkansas 71701-9775 United States
- Coordinates: 33°39′2″N 92°46′45″W

District information
- Grades: PK–12
- Accreditation: Arkansas Department of Education
- Schools: 4
- NCES District ID: 0507290

Students and staff
- Students: 1,057
- Teachers: 88.74 (on FTE basis)
- Staff: 175.74 (on FTE basis)
- Student–teacher ratio: 11.91

Other information
- Website: www.hgsd1.com

Harmony Grove School District (HGSD) is a public school district located in parts of Ouachita and Dallas counties with the majority of students living in Ouachita County. HGSD enrollment averages more than 1,000 students attending four schools. The district that encompasses 359.17 square miles (930.2 km^{2}) of land.

The district is governed by a seven-member school board, elected from zones representative of the district's population. HGSD is accredited by the Arkansas Department of Education (ADE).

== Attendance area ==
Within Ouachita County the district includes East Camden. Within Dallas County the district includes Sparkman. A portion of the district extends into Clark County.

== Schools ==
Secondary schools

- Harmony Grove High School, serving approximately 400 students in grades 7 through 12.
- Sparkman High School, serving approximately 100 students in grades 7 through 12.

Elementary schools

- Harmony Grove Elementary School, serving more than 300 students in kindergarten through grade 6.
- Sparkman Elementary School, serving approximately 100 students in pre-kindergarten through grade 6.
