= Sparkman, Arkansas =

- City
- Location of Sparkman in Dallas County, Arkansas.
- Coordinates: 33°55′02″N 92°51′00″W
- Country: United States
- State: Arkansas
- County: Dallas

Area
  - Total: 1.29 sq mi (3.34 km^{2})
  - Land: 1.29 sq mi (3.34 km^{2})
  - Water: 0 sq mi (0.00 km^{2})
- Elevation: 174 ft (53 m)

Population (2020)
  - Total: 355
  - Estimate (2025): 330 ▼
  - Density: 275.0/sq mi (106.19/km^{2})
- Time zone: UTC-6 (Central (CST))
  - Summer (DST): UTC-5 (CDT)
- ZIP code: 71763
- Area code: 870
- FIPS code: 05-65900
- GNIS feature ID: 2405501
- Website: cityofsparkman.com

Sparkman is a city in Dallas County, Arkansas, United States. The population was 355 at the 2020 census, down from 427 in 2010.

== History ==
Sparkman was established between 1911 and 1913 and was named after sawmill owner Lemuel "Pete" Sparkman. In 1915, the Sparkman News was established, Sparkman's first election was held, and electricity was installed. The first school in Sparkman was a two-story building with an enrollment of 132. H.O. Theatt was the first principal, with Miss Ethel Fite and Miss Ella Adams being the first teachers.

A Baptist church was organized in 1914, with Methodist and A.M.E. churches organizing in 1916.

== Geography ==
Sparkman is located in western Dallas County. Arkansas Highway 128 passes through the center of town as Main Street and leads southeast 11 miles (18 km) to Highway 9 at Holly Springs. Arkansas Highway 7 passes through the west side of Sparkman, leading north (with Highway 128) 10 miles (16 km) to Highway 8 at Dalark and south 27 miles (43 km) to Camden.

According to the United States Census Bureau, Sparkman has a total area of 1.3 square miles (3.4 km^{2}), all land.

=== Climate ===
The climate in this area is characterized by hot, humid summers and generally mild to cool winters. According to the Köppen Climate Classification system, Sparkman has a humid subtropical climate, abbreviated "Cfa" on climate maps.

Climate data for Sparkman, Arkansas (1991–2020 normals, extremes 1963–2020)
| Month | Jan | Feb | Mar | Apr | May | Jun | Jul | Aug | Sep | Oct | Nov | Dec | Year |
|---|---|---|---|---|---|---|---|---|---|---|---|---|---|
| Record high °F (°C) | 81 (27) | 95 (35) | 90 (32) | 94 (34) | 99 (37) | 104 (40) | 108 (42) | 110 (43) | 109 (43) | 95 (35) | 85 (29) | 79 (26) | 110 (43) |
| Mean maximum °F (°C) | 70.4 (21.3) | 74.5 (23.6) | 81.6 (27.6) | 85.4 (29.7) | 90.7 (32.6) | 94.9 (34.9) | 98.9 (37.2) | 99.3 (37.4) | 95.4 (35.2) | 87.1 (30.6) | 77.3 (25.2) | 70.8 (21.6) | 101.0 (38.3) |
| Mean daily maximum °F (°C) | 52.2 (11.2) | 57.4 (14.1) | 65.8 (18.8) | 74.4 (23.6) | 81.0 (27.2) | 88.0 (31.1) | 91.8 (33.2) | 90.9 (32.7) | 85.3 (29.6) | 73.9 (23.3) | 63.6 (17.6) | 54.8 (12.7) | 73.3 (22.9) |
| Daily mean °F (°C) | 41.4 (5.2) | 45.6 (7.6) | 53.4 (11.9) | 61.6 (16.4) | 69.9 (21.1) | 77.6 (25.3) | 81.3 (27.4) | 80.4 (26.9) | 74.0 (23.3) | 61.8 (16.6) | 51.7 (10.9) | 44.1 (6.7) | 61.9 (16.6) |
| Mean daily minimum °F (°C) | 30.6 (−0.8) | 33.7 (0.9) | 41.0 (5.0) | 48.7 (9.3) | 58.8 (14.9) | 67.1 (19.5) | 70.7 (21.5) | 69.8 (21.0) | 62.6 (17.0) | 49.7 (9.8) | 39.8 (4.3) | 33.5 (0.8) | 50.5 (10.3) |
| Mean minimum °F (°C) | 15.3 (−9.3) | 20.6 (−6.3) | 24.8 (−4.0) | 33.3 (0.7) | 44.2 (6.8) | 56.1 (13.4) | 63.6 (17.6) | 61.0 (16.1) | 48.3 (9.1) | 32.6 (0.3) | 23.6 (−4.7) | 19.8 (−6.8) | 13.4 (−10.3) |
| Record low °F (°C) | −10 (−23) | 10 (−12) | 11 (−12) | 24 (−4) | 32 (0) | 41 (5) | 52 (11) | 48 (9) | 34 (1) | 22 (−6) | 10 (−12) | −4 (−20) | −10 (−23) |
| Average precipitation inches (mm) | 4.43 (113) | 4.73 (120) | 5.64 (143) | 5.89 (150) | 6.26 (159) | 3.94 (100) | 3.88 (99) | 3.25 (83) | 3.56 (90) | 4.86 (123) | 4.24 (108) | 5.51 (140) | 56.19 (1,427) |
| Average snowfall inches (cm) | 0.8 (2.0) | 0.4 (1.0) | 0.4 (1.0) | 0.0 (0.0) | 0.0 (0.0) | 0.0 (0.0) | 0.0 (0.0) | 0.0 (0.0) | 0.0 (0.0) | 0.0 (0.0) | 0.0 (0.0) | 0.0 (0.0) | 1.6 (4.1) |
| Average precipitation days (≥ 0.01 in) | 7.8 | 9.1 | 8.8 | 8.4 | 8.5 | 7.0 | 7.3 | 6.3 | 5.7 | 6.4 | 8.0 | 8.4 | 91.7 |
| Average snowy days (≥ 0.1 in) | 0.2 | 0.3 | 0.2 | 0.0 | 0.0 | 0.0 | 0.0 | 0.0 | 0.0 | 0.0 | 0.0 | 0.0 | 0.7 |
Source: NOAA

== Demographics ==
Historical population
| Census | Pop. | Note | %± |
|---|---|---|---|
| 1920 | 561 | | — |
| 1930 | 711 | | 26.7% |
| 1940 | 840 | | 18.1% |
| 1950 | 964 | | 14.8% |
| 1960 | 787 | | −18.4% |
| 1970 | 663 | | −15.8% |
| 1980 | 622 | | −6.2% |
| 1990 | 553 | | −11.1% |
| 2000 | 586 | | 6.0% |
| 2010 | 427 | | −27.1% |
| 2020 | 355 | | −16.9% |
| 2025 (est.) | 330 | ▼ | −7.0% |
U.S. Decennial Census

As of the 2010 United States census, there were 427 people living in the city. The racial makeup of the city was 55.3% White, 38.4% Black and 1.4% from two or more races. 4.9% were Hispanic or Latino of any race.

As of the census of 2000, there were 586 people, 237 households, and 167 families living in the city. The population density was 451.4 inhabitants per square mile (174.3/km^{2}). There were 291 housing units at an average density of 224.2 per square mile (86.6/km^{2}). The racial makeup of the city was 50.85% White, 42.15% Black or African American, 0.34% Native American, 6.48% from other races, and 0.17% from two or more races. 6.83% of the population were Hispanic or Latino of any race.

There were 237 households, out of which 26.6% had children under the age of 18 living with them, 48.1% were married couples living together, 18.1% had a female householder with no husband present, and 29.5% were non-families. 27.0% of all households were made up of individuals, and 11.8% had someone living alone who was 65 years of age or older. The average household size was 2.47 and the average family size was 2.95.

In the city, the population was spread out, with 26.6% under the age of 18, 8.0% from 18 to 24, 23.5% from 25 to 44, 27.1% from 45 to 64, and 14.7% who were 65 years of age or older. The median age was 40 years. For every 100 females, there were 86.6 males. For every 100 females age 18 and over, there were 82.2 males.

The median income for a household in the city was $25,208, and the median income for a family was $32,875. Males had a median income of $26,875 versus $20,795 for females. The per capita income for the city was $12,492. About 14.0% of families and 21.9% of the population were below the poverty line, including 28.4% of those under age 18 and 18.6% of those age 65 or over.

== Education ==
Harmony Grove School District of Ouachita County operates local public schools.

Sparkman Elementary School and Sparkman High School have an enrollment of less than 200 pupils in the community. Sparkman athletics teams are known as the Raiders. They compete at the 1A level in girls and boys basketball, baseball, and softball. Sparkman had a football team until they consolidated in 2004. They were very competitive for many years in which they played in state playoff games, sometimes with only 16 players.

The community was previously in the Sparkman School District. On July 1, 2004, it consolidated into the Harmony Grove district.

== Notable people ==
- Bonnie Brown (born 1937), musician
- Jim Ed Brown (born 1934), musician
- The Browns, entertainers, Country Music Hall of Fame
- John Edward Taylor (born 1921), military archivist
- Samuel Woodrow Williams (born 1912), Civil Rights activist, professor of philosophy and religion

== Points of interest ==
- Sardis Methodist Church
- Tate's Bluff Fortification
- Long Lake and Round Lake
