= Samuel Woodrow Williams =

African American civil rights activist (1912–1970)

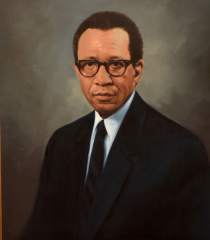
- Born: February 12, 1912
- Died: October 10, 1970 (aged 58)
- Education: Morehouse College, Howard University
- Occupations: Minister; professor; activist
- Movement: Civil Rights Movement
- Awards: NAACP Meritorious award, Phi beta sigma citizenship award

Samuel Woodrow Williams was a Baptist minister, professor of philosophy and religion, and Civil Rights activist. Williams was born on February 12, 1912, in Sparkman (Dallas County) then grew up in Chicot County, Arkansas. An African American, Williams attended Morehouse College where he received his bachelor's degree in philosophy and later attended Howard University earning his master's degree in divinity.

Williams aided in the Atlanta Student Movement and helped found both the Southern Christian Leadership Conference (SCLC) and the Atlanta Summit Leadership Council, which then helped to organize the Atlanta branch of the Community Relations Commission (CRC). Simultaneously he was co-chairman of the Atlanta Summit Leadership Conference and acting president of the Atlanta Branch of the National Association for the Advancement of Colored People (NAACP).

In 1947, Williams became pastor at Friendship Baptist Church and lectured at more than 20 colleges and universities throughout the South preaching that men should lead their lives through principle and moral awareness. In his final years of life Williams expanded his sermons to focus on a non-violent approach, arguing that society is a slave to social systems, social patterns, and burdened by the anxiety to destroy one another. This message was conveyed through a sermon that he dedicated to Martin Luther King Jr., entitled "He was no Criminal," in 1969.

Williams died from complications as a result of a major operation. The Negro History Collection at Atlanta libraries was renamed the Samuel W. Williams Collection on Black America and is now housed at the Auburn Avenue Research Library on African American Culture and History, part of the Atlanta-Fulton Public Library System in Atlanta's Sweet Auburn Historic District.

== Early life ==
Samuel Woodrow Williams was born in Sparkman, Arkansas in Dallas County on February 12, 1912. He was the oldest of eight children of Arthur William and Annie Willie Butler Williams. He enjoyed hunting, fishing, playing basketball and baseball as well as reading and writing.

== Education ==
In 1932–1933, Williams attended the historically black Philander Smith College in Little Rock and then transferred to Morehouse College in Atlanta, Georgia. Williams received his Bachelor of Arts Degree in Philosophy from Morehouse in 1937. Williams then earned his masters of divinity from Howard University from 1938 to 1942. He studied under Dr. Alain Locke and Dr. Benjamin E. Mays. He began doctoral studies at University of Chicago, but did not complete the program. He received an honorary doctorate from Arkansas Baptist College in 1960.

== Morehouse College ==
After completing his formal educations Williams joined the faculty of Morehouse College in 1946 as the chair of the Department of Philosophy and Religion. As chair of the department he wrote annual reports to the president and lead meetings on the improvement of the department and college as a whole. In 1963, Williams, as the head of the Department of Religion, expressed his concerns that there was only a minor in religion and of the absence of an honors program for the department. Williams wanted Morehouse to have religion at the center of its programs.

During his time at Morehouse, Williams earned a reputation of intellectually rigorous and demanding of his students. While teaching at Morehouse, Williams mentored Dr. Samuel DuBois Cook who later become the president of Dillard University and the first black mayor of Atlanta, Maynard Jackson. Williams is also credited as mentor and former teacher of Martin Luther King Jr., leader in the Civil Rights Movement.

== NAACP ==
In the 1950s Williams began his association with the Atlanta branch of the NAACP. He joined the executive branch and later became president in 1957.

During his time as president Williams engaged in his first legal battle in January 1958 when the NAACP filed suit against Atlanta's school board and forced it to begin what became a long and fraught process of compliance with Brown v. Board of Education. After the Montgomery Bus Boycott, Reverend John Porter and Williams filed suit against the segregated Atlanta trolley system with and won in 1959. Williams and the NAACP pushed for education reform, desegregation of hotels and restaurants, and challenged hotel misconduct and discrimination.

== Atlanta Student Movement ==
Williams played a key role in the Atlanta Student Movement. The movement was characterized by an appeal that composed both their complaints as well as their desired goals for proposed change. Williams was one of the adults that encouraged students to draft "An Appeal for Human Rights," the manifesto of the Atlanta Student Movement. This appeal was published in early March 1960 in the Atlanta newspapers and the New York Times.

As the NAACP president Williams pledged full support to this act of civil resistance. They conducted a nonviolent protest and civil disobedience that produced productive dialogues between activists and government authorities. Forms of protest and/or civil disobedience included boycotts and sit ins that contributed to the Civil Rights Movement.

During the same year Williams became a founding member and a vice president of the Southern Christian Leadership Council (SCLC).

The SCLC is an African American Civil Rights organization that began in 1957. SCLC's goal is to form an organization whose trademark is of peace and non-violence. During the initial years of operation, leaders like Martin Luther King Jr. and Williams encountered repression from white organization, police and the Ku Klux Klan. SCLC advocates for the involvement of churches in political activism. Members of the SCLC were harassed, threatened and attacked, yet Williams and others believed the church should continue to include social-political activity.

=== Other Social Services ===
Williams helped found the Atlanta Summit Leadership Council (ASLC). During the 1960s and 1970s the ASLC pressured the school board and city to end segregation emphasizing boycotts, sit-ins, marches, and similar tactics that relied on mass mobilization, nonviolent resistance, and civil disobedience. Through the ASLC Williams led campaigns to expose the city of Atlanta and fought to expand mass transit into the predominantly African-American west side of the city.

In 1966 Mayor Ivan Allen established the Community Relations Commission (CRC). Mayor Allen made Williams Vice Chair of the Atlanta branch. The organization gave grassroots communities a mechanism to voice their concerns to city officials at the highest level. The organization worked for ending discriminatory hiring and promotions at City Hall. The CRC, under Williams conducted a study that proves the lack of minority hiring and the promotional practices of the city of Atlanta. This study was necessary in the CRC's argument in minority promotions.

== Friendship Baptist Church ==
Friendship Baptist Church is one of the most prominent black baptist churches in Atlanta founded in 1865. In 1947 Williams became assistant pastor of Friendship Baptist Church. Later to become Senior Pastor, Williams was one of the most activist-oriented pastors in Friendship's history.

=== Sermons ===
On February 19, 1969, Williams delivered a sermon on "A Challenge to Young Black College Students" stating that saying only Black teachers educate Black scholars is invalid and that good committed teachers regardless of color were needed. In his sermons, he stressed that the black community is in sophisticated evasion cloaked in the fragile robe of good faith. He wanted his audience to steer away from moral double takes that is eroding away the moral integrity of the nation. Although, Williams was pro-civil disobedience, he, on occasion, lead sermons asserting that the system of society allows for the murder of a man in order to preserve social collectivities. Williams also warned the system is what allowed the enslavement, and exploitation of Blacks due to white despising Blacks. Williams loath the way the system had set up artificial barriers to deny other men their God given right.

After becoming pastor in 1954, Williams made vast improvements to the church such as building a low-rent apartment complex in 1969 and a parking lot that was paid off in 8 months. Williams continue to deliver sermons all across the country, however. Samuel Williams delivered a most-notable remarkable sermon on June 30, 1968, to an all white audience at All Saints Episcopal Church. There, he urged his audience to question what was their responsibility for justice, contending the power of deciding was in their field because they made up the vast majority. That is where he established his platform of schools should be a forum for the Christian's demand for justice.

== Criticism and legacy ==
Samuel Woodrow Williams' legacy was his contribution to the Civil Rights Movement and sermons at Friendship Baptist Church. He had, however, left an almost forgotten legacy of racial progress in Atlanta. Young men in his community critiqued him as dictatorial and an ineffective leader. Others accused him of failing to hold elections and of supporting a public housing controversy. Williams was also criticized for supporting white officials in the firing of Eliza Paschall, director of the CRC who was too "pro-black."

=== Awards ===
- Alpha Kappa Delta national honorary sociological fraternity (initiation certificate) - 1948
- Atlanta Morehouse club distinguished service award - 1959
- Phi Beta Sigma citizenship award (Chi Chapter) - 1959
- YMCA century club award - 1959
- Atlanta branch NAACP plague for presidency - 1964
- NAACP Meritorious award - 1969
- Community relations commission post humous - 1970
- YMCA men's club international ( Omega Chapter) - 1970

== Death ==
Williams died in October 1970 after a surgical procedure. He was survived by his wife, Billye, who later married baseball great Hank Aaron. He was buried at Atlanta's South-View Cemetery.
