= Grand Bargain (humanitarian reform) =

Global agreement on humanitarian funding reform

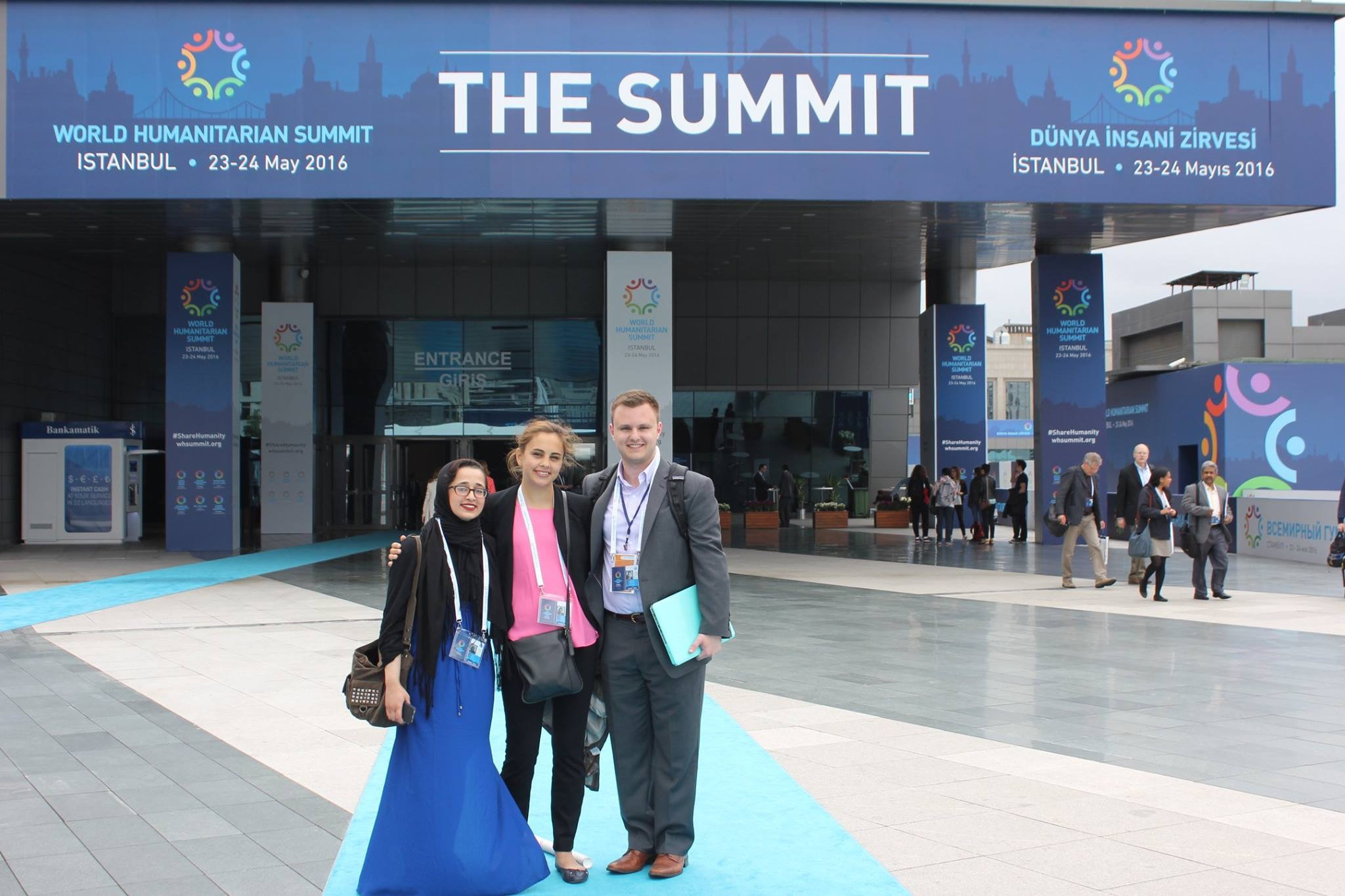

The Grand Bargain: Agenda for Humanity, usually called the Grand Bargain, is an agreement to reform the delivery of humanitarian aid, that was struck at the World Humanitarian Summit in May 2016. The agreement contains 51 specific commitments, grouped into ten focus areas, with activity targets to be completed by January 1, 2020.

Parties to the agreement are national governments and humanitarian aid agencies, 30 of which initially signed up, rising to 48 within the first year; the 48 signatories controlled 95% of global humanitarian aid spending at the time. As of 2025, 71 signatories were part of the Grand Bargain process reform, representing an array of humanitarian actors including, 25 members states, 30 NGOs, 12 UN agencies, 2 Red Cross/Red Crescent movements and 2 Inter-governmental organisations.

By 2020, only partial progress had occurred, prompting criticism from some humanitarian practitioners and reflection from others that the original ambitions has an unrealistic time frame.

Five years after the initial agreement of the Grand Bargain in 2016, the Signatories undertook a review in 2021, resulting in the launch of the Grand Bargain 2.0 for two years (until 2023).

In June 2023, the 66 signatories endorsed the new iteration of the Grand Bargain for the 2023-2026 period. Anchored in the original commitments of the agreement, the humanitarian actors focus their efforts on quality funding, localisation, participation of affected populations, the nexus approach, innovative financing, and anticipatory action.

== Background ==
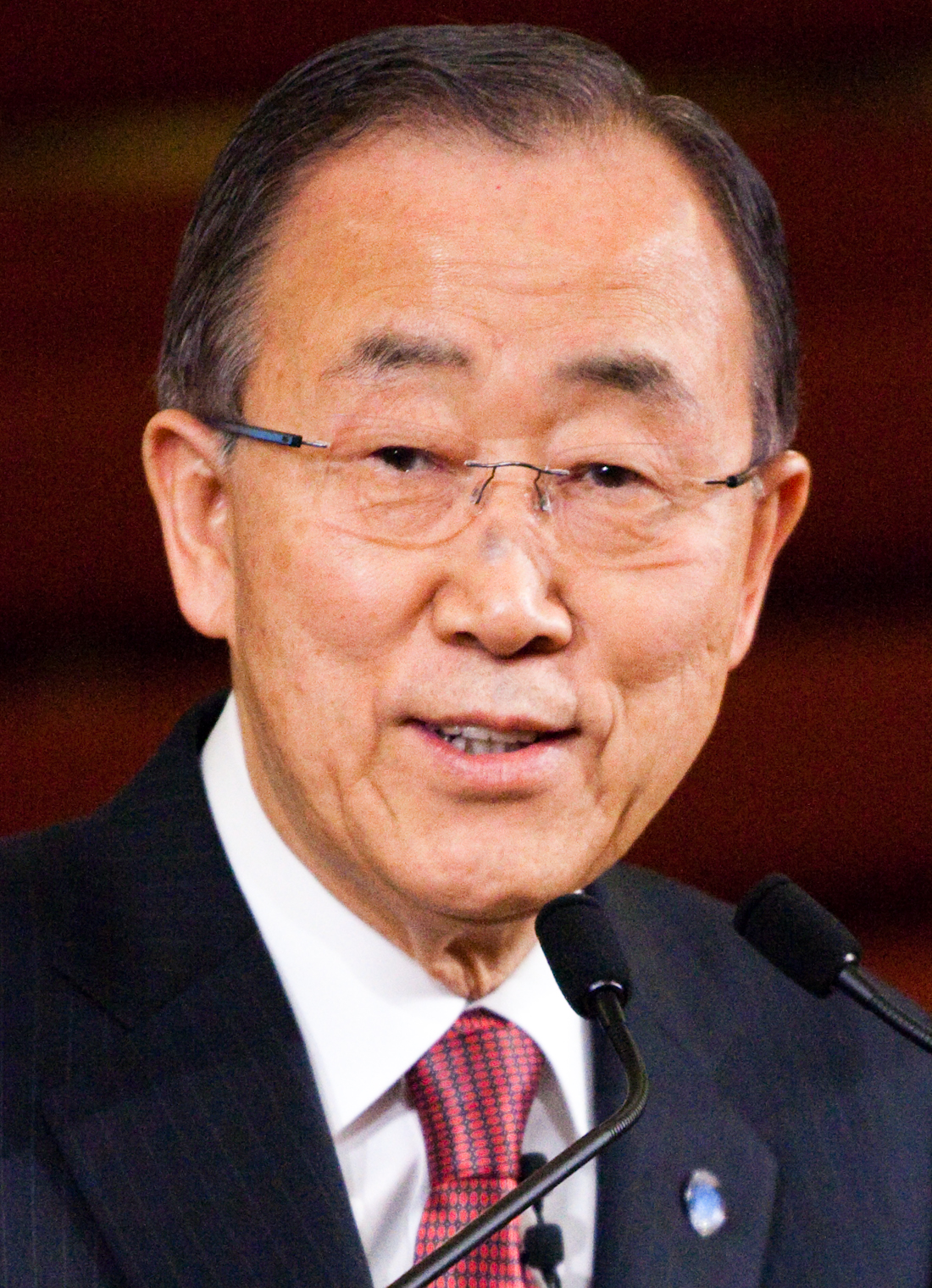
United Nations Secretary-General Ban Ki-moon, 2016

As part of his 2012 goal to improve the humanitarian system, United Nations Secretary-General Ban Ki-moon convened the 2016 World Humanitarian Summit in Istanbul with the goal of knowledge sharing and creating best practices. Ki-moon created the High-Level Panel on Humanitarian Financing, appointing Kristalina Georgieva and Nazrin Shah of Perak, as co-chairs.

High-Level Panel on Humanitarian Financing
Name	Nationality	Affiliation	Role
Kristalina Georgieva	Bulgaria	Vice President for Budget and Human Resources, the European Commission	co-chair
Sultan Nazrin Shah	Malaysia	Ruler of Perak, Malaysia	co-chair
Hadeel Ibrahim	United Kingdom	Executive Director, Mo Ibrahim Foundation	member
Badr Jafar	United Arab Emirates	Managing Director, the Crescent Group	member
Walt Macnee	Canada	Vice Chairman, Mastercard	member
Trevor Manuel	South Africa	Senior Advisor, Rothschild Group	member
Linah Mohohlo	Botswana	Governor, Bank of Botswana	member
Dhananjayan Sriskandarajah	Sri Lanka	Secretary-General, CIVICUS	member
Margot Wallström	Sweden	Minister for Foreign Affairs	member

The High-Level Panel on Humanitarian Financing produced the report Too important to fail - addressing the humanitarian financing gap which was presented at the World Humanitarian Summit in May 2016. The report highlighted a US$15 billion shortfall between the cost of addressing humanitarian needs and the global budget to respond. It called for new ways to fund growing humanitarian needs, such as taxation for luxury goods and services. The group's report called for a Grand Bargain between nations to address the unmet humanitarian needs.

== Agreement ==
=== Focus areas ===
Parties to the agreement committed transparently and harmoniously sharing high-quality data on humanitarian funding within two years. The agreement indicated that the International Aid Transparency Initiative data model was likely the best mechanism to record the data. They also committed to increase spending on local organisations from 0.4% of the overall budget to 25% by 2020. In subsequent years, this effort became known as Localisation. On cash and voucher assistance, conflicting statements were made simultaneously mentioning the benefits of giving people with humanitarian needs cash, but without setting any specific targets, and also calling for more research into benefits and risks. Parties agreed to reduce duplication and management costs; to harmonise the templates for grant agreements between government donors and humanitarian agencies. There was agreement for unification of assessments of unmet humanitarian needs, although that element was criticised by ACAPS for not addressing the necessary changes they called for. A commitment was made to better include the perspectives of the people in communities affected by humanitarian crisis. Parties committed to multi-year funding; to provide aid agencies with agreements to fund their activities for multiple years at a time, rather than requiring annual requests for funding. Parties committed to put more funding into emergency funds, such as the Central Emergency Relief Fund, in order to increase flexibility of how funds can be used in emergencies. Government donors agreed to harmonise the reporting requirements they put on humanitarian agencies by 2018, and reduce the reporting volume. There was agreement to improve collaboration and coordination between groups working on prevention of humanitarian crisis, those working on mitigating the effects of crisis and those responding to emergencies. In total, the Grand Bargain included 51 specific commitments each grouped under the aforementioned themes.

In 2021, a strategic shift was made as the Grand Bargain and its signatories adopted a narrower set of objectives and related adjustments to structures and ways of working to ensure a higher political engagement. This transition was driven both by what had been achieved to date in the various thematic areas of the original Grand Bargain framework from 2016.

As part of the 2023-2026 Grand Bargain iteration, two focus areas have been decided among the Signatories:

• Focus Area 1: Continued support to localisation, participation of affected communities, and quality funding.

• Focus Area 2: Catalysing sector wide transformation through the Grand Bargain.

• Cross-cutting issues

-Gender

-Risk Sharing

=== Commitments ===
The Grand Bargain sets out 51 commitments, distilled into 10 thematic workstreams:

• Workstream 1: Greater Transparency

• Workstream 2: More support and funding tools for local and national responders

• Workstream 3: Increase the use and coordination of cash-based programming

• Workstream 4: Reduce duplication and management costs with periodic functional reviews

• Workstream 5: Improve joint and impartial needs assessment

• Workstream 6: Participation Revolution: include people receiving aid in making the decisions which affect their lives

• Workstream 7&8: Increase collaborative humanitarian multi-year planning and funding & reduce earmarking of donor contribution

• Workstream 9: Harmonise and simplify reporting requirements

• Workstream 10: Humanitarian-development nexus

Summary of the Grand Bargain donor (and aid agency) commitments
Topic	Stakeholder(s)	Commitment
Transparency	Aid agencies and donors	Publishing transparency, timely, open, and harmonized high quality data on funding, within two years of the summit
Transparency	Aid agencies and donors	To make use of data that explains the distinctness of aid agencies, and the contexts in which they work
Transparency	Aid agencies and donors	To improve use of digital tools for accountability, decision making, efficiency, and funding traceability
Transparency	Aid agencies and donors	To support others with regards to data access and data publishing
Localisation	Aid agencies and donors	Provide multi-year funding to local and national aid agencies
Localisation	Aid agencies and donors	Remove barriers that block partnerships with local and national aid agencies
Localisation	Aid agencies and donors	To support and collaborate with national governments coordination of humanitarian aid
Localisation	Aid agencies and donors	To provide 25% of funding to local or national organizations as directly as possible
Localisation	Aid agencies and donors	To agree, with the Inter Agency Standing Committee, key performance indicator about localisation efforts
Localisation	Aid agencies and donors	To increase the use of funding tools that enable more funding to local and national aid agencies
Use of cash	Aid agencies and donors	To increase the use of cash, vouchers and in-kind in humanitarian aid.
Use of cash	Aid agencies and donors	To fund new aid delivery models that can increase the scale of aid
Use of cash	Aid agencies and donors	To assess the cost and benefits of cash (including for protection) compared to in-kind aid.
Use of cash	Aid agencies and donors	To agree standards and share information about cash programming to better understand the costs and benefits
Use of cash	Aid agencies and donors	To monitor and evaluate cash programming in a coordinated way
Use of cash	Aid agencies and donors	To do more cash programming, where appropriate
Cost efficiency	Aid agencies and donors	To increase efficiencies of delivery aid with a focus on technology and innovation
Cost efficiency	Aid agencies and donors	Harmonize partnership agreements and share information about the needs of people affected by crises
Cost efficiency	Aid agencies	To provide transparent and comparable cost structures
Cost efficiency	Aid agencies	To maximize efficiency with regards to procurement of goods and services
Cost efficiency	Donors	To reduce individual donors monitoring and evaluations and to make joined assessments
Needs assessment	Aid agencies and donors	To collaborate on one centralised needs assessment for each individual humanitarian emergency
Needs assessment	Aid agencies and donors	To coordinate data collection with a view to reduce intrusion for people affected by crises
Needs assessment	Aid agencies and donors	To quickly share needs assessment data, while being mindful of privacy and protection needs
Needs assessment	Aid agencies and donors	To fund expert third-party support for data collection to improve collaboration
Needs assessment	Aid agencies and donors	To prioritize activities based on evidence.
Needs assessment	Aid agencies and donors	To fund independent evaluation of needs assessments
Needs assessment	Aid agencies and donors	To undertake risk and vulnerability assessments in collaboration with local authorities and international development agencies
Participation and inclusion	Aid agencies and donors	Improve national leadership and governance capacity
Participation and inclusion	Aid agencies and donors	Create common standards for community participation and engagement
Participation and inclusion	Aid agencies and donors	Improve dialogue with local stakeholders
Participation and inclusion	Aid agencies and donors	Create systems to ensure that feedback from local stakeholders is acted upon
Participation and inclusion	Donors	To be flexible with funding to allow adaptions to local community feedback
Participation and inclusion	Donors	To fund and invest time in participation and inclusion
Participation and inclusion	Aid agencies	To ensure that monitoring and evaluation plans include community feedback by 2017
Multi-year funding	Aid agencies and donors	To increase funding agreements to cover multiple years, to document efficiency and effectiveness, and to pass on multi-year funding agreements to implementing sub-contractors.
Multi-year funding	Aid agencies and donors	To provide multi year funding and associated monitoring and evaluation to at least five national response plans by 2017
Multi-year funding	Aid agencies and donors	To improve coordination and collaboration on sharing needs assessments between humanitarian aid and international development stakeholders.
Reducing the earmarking of funds by nation	Aid agencies and donors	To collectively annually agree the most effective mechanism to report on unearmarked or "softly earmarked" funds by 2017
Reducing the earmarking of funds by nation	Aid agencies and donors	To increase flexibility of funding, to reduce earmarking funding to certain nations
Reducing the earmarking of funds by nation	Aid agencies	To transparently and regularly share information on how unearmarked funds are spent.
Reducing the earmarking of funds by nation	Aid agencies	To publicly acknowledge donors who provide flexible funds
Reducing the earmarking of funds by nation	Donors	To reduce national earmarked funds
Reporting	Aid agencies and donors	To harmonize and simplify donor reporting by the end of 2018
Reporting	Aid agencies and donors	To increase use of digital technology in donor reporting
Reporting	Aid agencies and donors	To improve the efficiency and quality of reporting
Coordination	Aid agencies and donors	To increase efforts to prevent humanitarian needs
Coordination	Aid agencies and donors	To invest in sustainable solutions for people who are forcibly displaced and those returning
Coordination	Aid agencies and donors	To bolster local systems and to improve local social protection
Coordination	Aid agencies and donors	To undertake collaborative vulnerability and risk analysis with international development agencies
Coordination	Aid agencies and donors	To engage better with multilateral development banks.

In addition to improving the humanitarian system, the commitments were expected to save US$1 billion per year.

Each of the ten focus areas has two co-conveners, a government donor and a humanitarian aid agency who report into a facilitation group that coordinates the work between the ten focus areas.

== Political leadership ==
Between 2016 and 2023, the Grand Bargain was championed by an Eminent Person, responsible for promoting and advocating for the advancement of the Grand Bargain commitments.

List of Eminent Persons
Name	Organisation	Period
Jan Egeland	Norwegian Refugee Council	2021-2023
Sigrid Kaag	Minister for Foreign Trade and Development Cooperation (Netherlands)	2019-2021
Kristalina Georgieva	World Bank	2016-2019

=== The Ambassadors ===
As of June 2023, the Grand Bargain is championed by three Ambassadors, in 2023-2026: Jemilah Mahmood, Manuel Bessler and Michael Köhler.

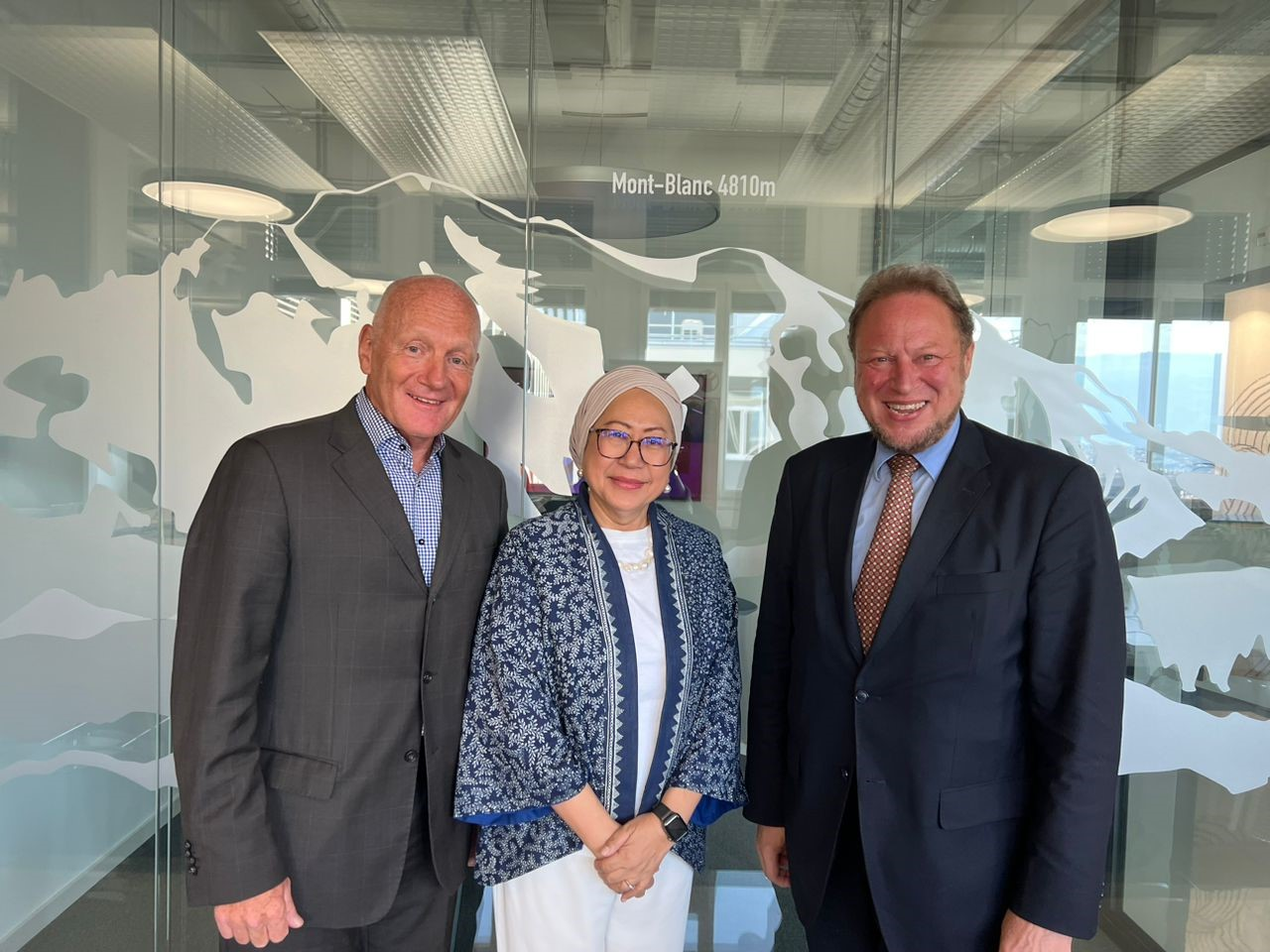
Grand Bargain Ambassadors in Geneva on 5 September 2023, from left to right: Manuel Bessler, Jemilah Mahmood, Michael Köhler.

Jemilah Mahmood, a humanitarian and medical professional, is currently the Executive Director of the Sunway Centre for Planetary Health at Sunway University in Malaysia. She also advises the Consultative Council for Foreign Policy Malaysia and Ministry of Health Malaysia. Manuel Bessler led humanitarian efforts at Swiss Agency for Development and Cooperation and UN OCHA for over two decades, with roles in New York, Jerusalem, and Pakistan, and worked with UNPROFOR in Yugoslavia in 1994.

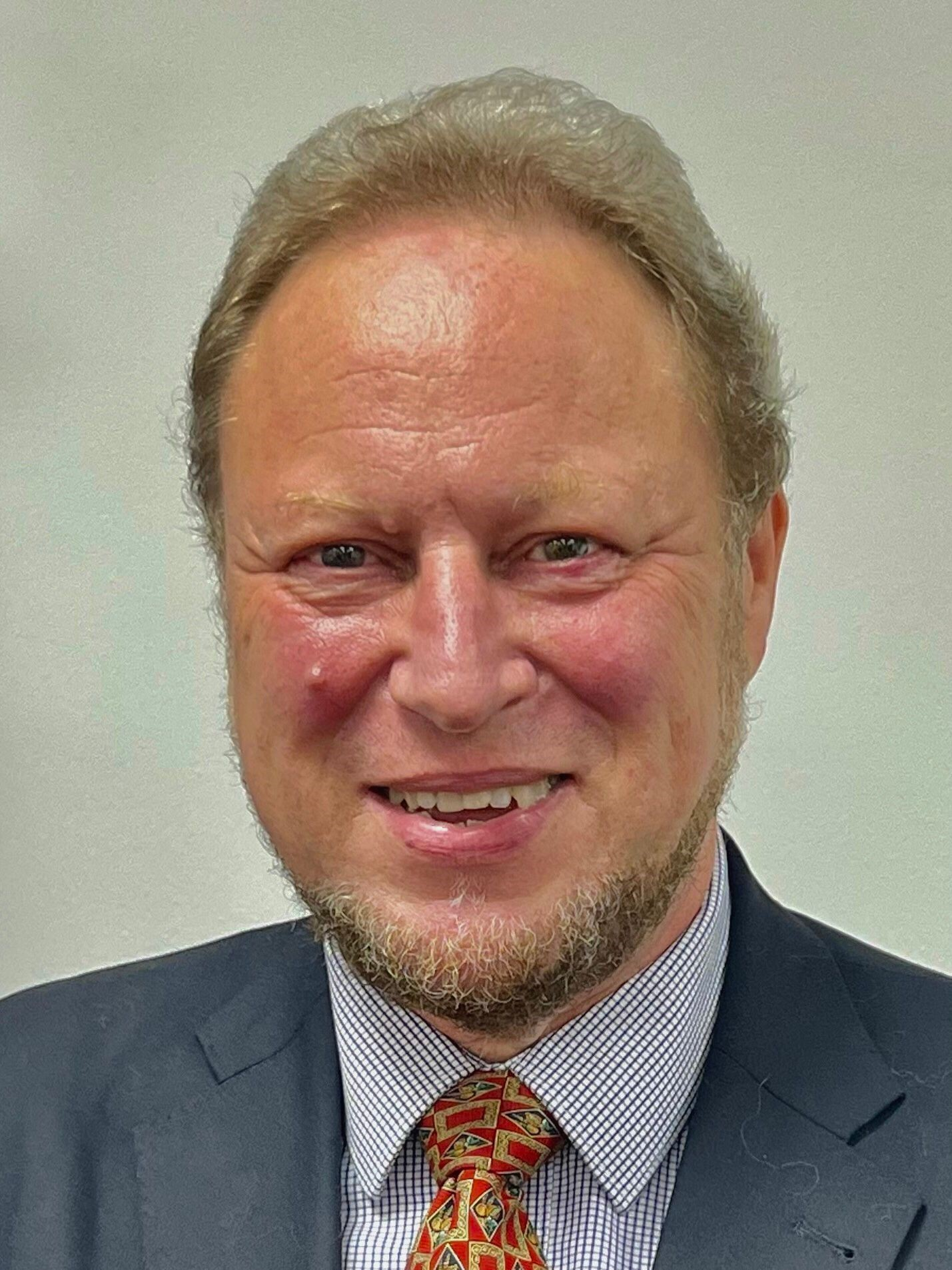
Michael Köhler

Michael Köhler serves as Deputy Director-General for European Civil Protection and Humanitarian Aid Operations at the European Commission, overseeing EU humanitarian aid worldwide. He previously held a number of senior positions in the European Commission, focussing on external relations, neighbourhood, development, energy and maritime policies. Before joining the EU, he worked in the German cooperation ministry BMZ and as a country representative in Morocco and Tunisia for the Konrad-Adenauer-Foundation.

They are responsible for steering the process towards its strategic objective. Each of them leads on specific focus area: participation, localisation, quality funding, and catalysing system-wide transformation.

Ambassadors
Name	Focus Area
Jemilah Mahmood	Participation
Manuel Bessler	Localisation and quality funding
Michael Köhler	Quality funding and catalysing sector wide transformation – anticipatory action, multi-stakeholder collaboration and innovative financing

== Signatories ==
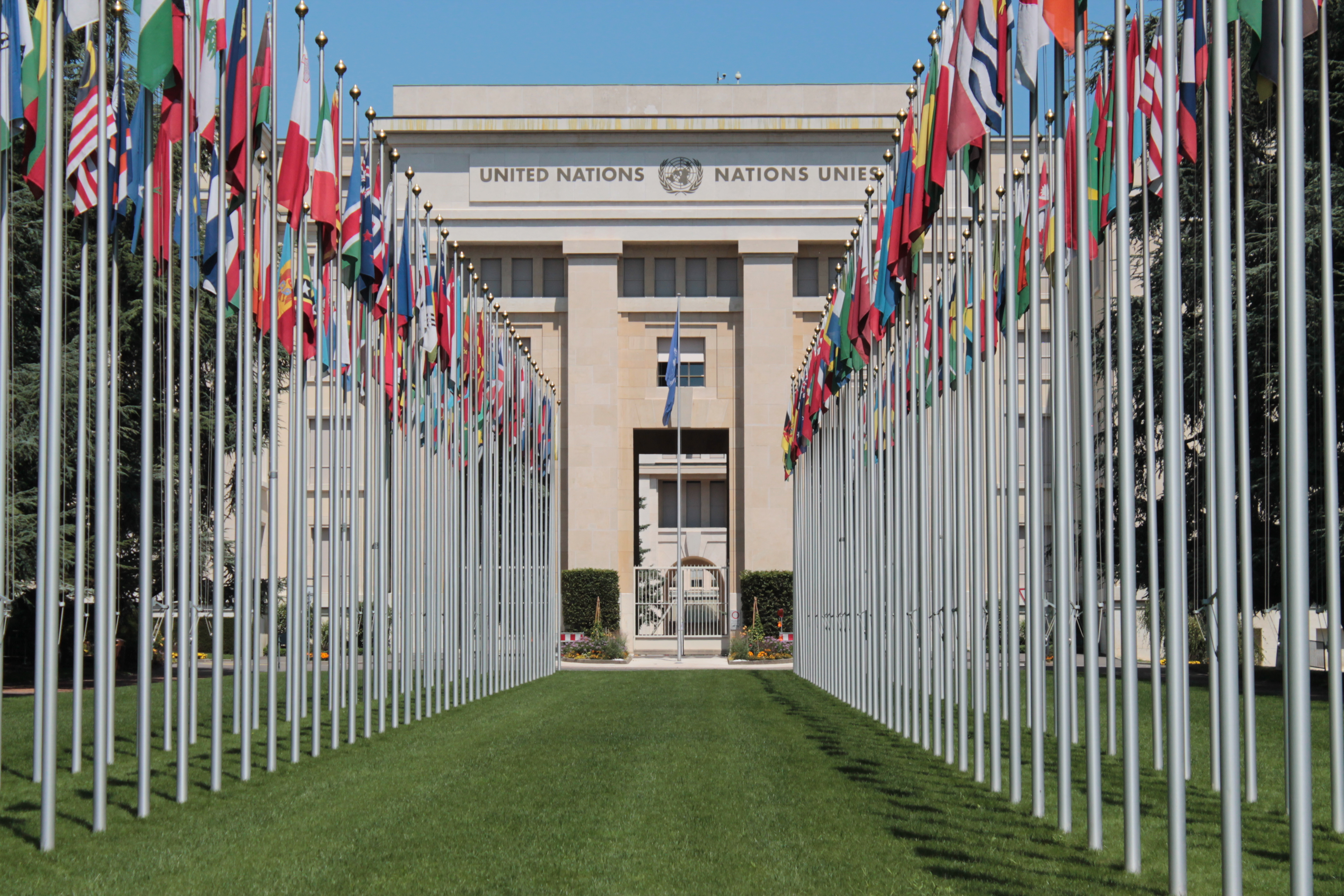
United Nations headquarters, Geneva

30 governments and aid agencies signed up to the Grand Bargain initially, expanding to 48 by March 2017. At the time, the 48 signatories controlled 95% of global spending on humanitarian aid. By December 2021, 64 organizations had signed up. Government signatories included USA, UK, Germany, France, and Japan; aid agency signatories included the International Federation of Red Cross and Red Crescent Societies.

Aid agency, Medecins Sans Frontieres, did not sign the agreement, criticizing the process for its non-binding commitments, a decision itself that was criticized as "cynical" by Nancy Lindborg of the United States Institute of Peace.

In 2023, 66 signatories are part of the process.

List of Signatories
	A4EP	Danish Church Aid	IFRC	Mercy Corps	SCHR
ActionAid International	Denmark	ILO	NEAR Network	Slovenia	Switzerland
Australia	Estonia	InterAction	New Zealand	Spain	Syria Relief
Belgium	EU/DG ECHO	IOM	Norway	Sweden	Netherlands
Bulgaria	FAO	IRC	Norwegian Refugee Council	Trocaire	United States of America
CAFOD	Finland	Ireland	OCHA	UN Women	UNRWA
Canada	France	Islamic Relief	OECD	UNDP	WFP
CARE International	Germany	Italy	Oxfam	UNFPA	WHO
Catholic Relief Services	Global Communities	Japan	Pan American Development Foundation	UNHCR	World Bank
Christian Aid	ICRC	Luxembourg	Relief International	UNICEF	World Vision International
Czech Republic	ICVA	Republic of Korea	Save the Children	United Kingdom	ZOA International

== Critical reception in 2016 ==
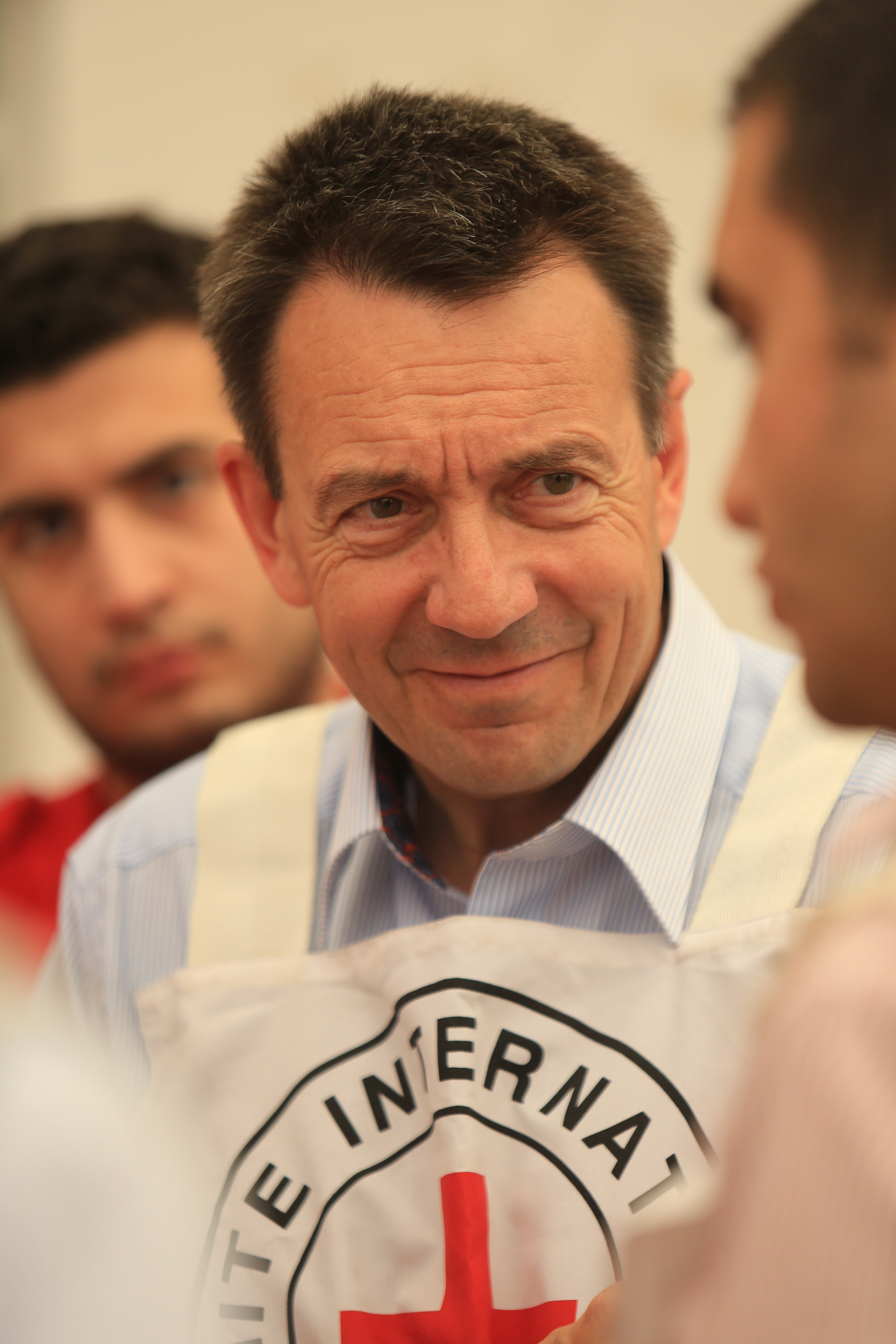
Peter Maurer of the ICRC

In 2016, the Grand Bargain was met with a mixture of enthusiasm, pragmatic caution, and dismay. Lilianne Ploumen pointed out how difficult it is to get multiple governments to all agree to big changes. The Overseas Development Institute criticized the Grand Bargain for its similarity with the status quo, pointing out a need for more specific targets and timelines. Colin Bruce of the World Bank said that the agreement was owned by no-one and stressed the importance of following up on the commitments. Peter Maurer of the International Committee of the Red Cross praised the focus on reducing reporting to donor governments.

Andras Derzsi-Horvath and Julia Steets of the Global Public Policy Institute published an op-ed in DW News criticizing the Grand Bargain for having only voluntary obligations.

== Progress towards commitments and critique in the 2020s ==
In 2021, The New Humanitarian reported that many of the 51 commitments had only been partly met. Wendy Fenton of the Humanitarian Practice Network and Overseas Development Institute said that the 51 commitments were too much to have attempted in five years.

A June 2021 independent review of the Grand Bargain by the Overseas Development Institute praised the progress towards policy shifts around provision of cash assistance, increasing funding to local aid groups, harmonised needs assessments and reporting. It was noted that the policy had a lower impact on actual practice. The Overseas Development Institute review criticised the way the transparency commitments were written, noted the lack of global agreement on how to distribute cash to people in need, and lamented the poor progress towards cost savings. The review reported a lack of political interest in including the perspectives of the people living in humanitarian crises in designing emergency responses.

UK-based group Development Initiatives reported in 2021 that the percentage of funding going to local organisations between 2016 and 2020 actually reduced from 3.5% to 2.1%. Degan Ali, of Adeso writing in OpenDemocracy in 2020, described the Grand Bargain as a "failed effort".

Since 2016, some progress has been noted on the Annual Independent Reports conducted by the Oversea Development Institute.

== Grand Bargain 2.0 ==
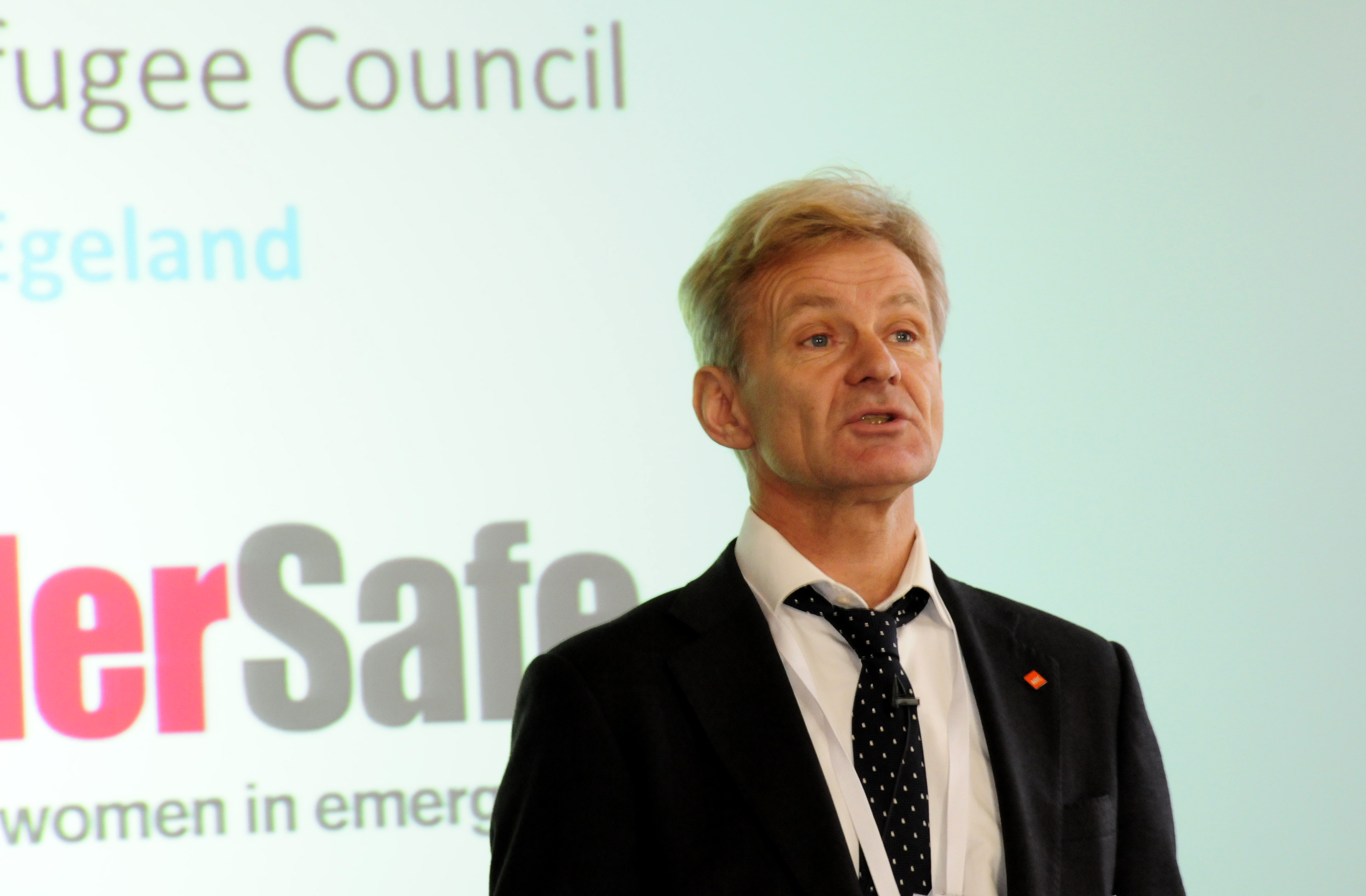
Jan Egeland of the Norwegian Refugee Council

In 2021, 60 donors started new negotiations to create an updated Grand Bargain 2.0 that will cover 2020 to 2023. Grand Bargain 2.0 focuses on greater support to local humanitarian agencies, improved participation of people from communities affected by humanitarian crisis and more flexible funding to aid agencies. The June 2021 meeting to agree details was led by Jan Egeland, of the Norwegian Refugee Council.

The Grand Bargain 2.0 agreement attempts to address concerns raised about the original agreement with a focus on an improved consultation process with local organizations.p. 36

== Grand Bargain 2023-2026 ==
After a series of consultations and deliberations among the signatories, a consensus has been reached that the Grand Bargain will be extended until at least 2026, which will mark a decade since its initial launch. Following this milestone, a high-level event will be convened to evaluate accomplishments and chart the future course of the agenda.

== See also ==
- UN Office for the Coordination of Humanitarian Affairs
- Network for Empowered Aid Response
