= Degan Ali =

Somali-American humanitarian leader

- Born: Somalia
- Employer: Adeso
- Organization: Network for Empowered Aid Response
- Mother: Fatima Jibrell

Degan Ali is the Somali-American humanitarian consultant and the executive director of Adeso.

She is best known for her critique of power dynamics in the humanitarian aid system and promotion of cash assistance.

== Early life and education ==
Born in Somalia to mother Fatima Jibrell and a father who was a Somali military officer and diplomat, her family moved to Washington when Degan Ali was nine years old. Her family lived in Chicago where she attended school and university.

== Career and advocacy ==
Ali was employed by the United Nations and deployed to Somalia before she resigned in disillusionment. After initially working as the Vice Director, she became Executive Director of Adeso (African Development Solutions) where she has been at the forefront of advocacy efforts to provide more funding to local humanitarian organizations, and to use more cash assistance.

After speaking about the lack of localisation at the 2016 World Humanitarian Summit, Ali became the founder of the Network for Empowered Aid Response. She has called for local organizations to take power, rather than wait for it to be given to them.

In 2020, she spoke to The New Humanitarian and was critical of the failures to implement the Grand Bargain.

In 2021, at the Global Steering Group Impact Summit she warned of colonial attitudes and how they influence international aid spending.

Ali runs DA Consulting, which created a framework to help international aid agencies to decolonise and switch away from service delivery towards advocacy and solidarity with local aid agencies.

=== Selected publications ===
- Degan Ali and Kirsten Gelsdorf, Risk-averse to risk-willing: Learning from the 2011 Somalia cash response, Global Food Security 1.1 (2012): 57-63.
- Degan Ali and Kate Churchill-Smith, Seeking Acceptance: The Promise of Cash in High-Risk Areas, Prepared for the Second World Conference on Humanitarian Studies at Tufts University, June 2011
- Degan Ali and Marie-Rose Romain Murphy, Black Lives Matter is also a reckoning for foreign aid and international NGOs, OpenDemocracy, 2020
- Degan Ali, Fanta Toure and Tilleke Kiewied, Cash relief in a contested area Lessons from Somalia 2005, Humanitarian Practice Network

== See also ==
- Localisation (humanitarian practice)
