= Antibe Therapeutics =

Pharmaceutical corporation

Antibe Therapeutics Inc.
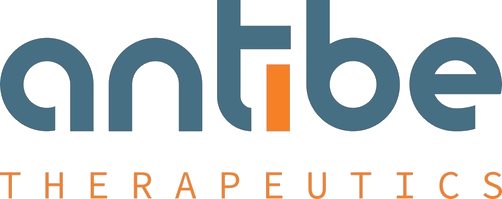
- Logo of Antibe Therapeutics
- Company type: Publicly traded corporation
- Traded as: TSX: ATE
- Industry: Pharmaceuticals
- Founded: 1 January 2010
- Headquarters: Toronto, Canada
- Key people: Dan Legault JD, CEO; Alain Wilson, CFO; Dr. John L. Wallace, Chief Scientific Officer; Joseph Stauffer, Chief Medical Officer
- Website: www.antibethera.com

Antibe Therapeutics was a Toronto-based pharmaceutical company that develops pain and inflammation-reducing drugs based on gaseous mediator technology. Antibe was founded by John L. Wallace, also a co-founder of NicOx, the first company to develop drugs utilizing gaseous mediators. Founded in 2009, the company listed on the TSX Venture Exchange in 2013 and was moved to the Toronto Stock Exchange in November 2020. In 2015, Antibe acquired Citagenix, a distributor involved in regenerative medicine.

On June 1, 2020, the company announced positive results in the final Phase 2 trial of its first drug Otenaproxesul.

On March 29, 2021, the drug's Investigational New Drug application was cleared by the US Food and Drug Administration, allowing for human trials.

In May 2024 the company went bankrupt and its stock was delisted from the Toronto Stock Exchange.

== Products ==
The mechanism of action of Antibe's drugs is the delivery of minute amounts of hydrogen sulfide to sites of inflammation within the human body. Hydrogen sulfide has been shown to enhance the resolution of injury and repair of damage arising from tissue inflammation.

Antibe's lead drug, Otenaproxesul (formerly ATB-346, now known by its International Nonproprietary Name), is a hydrogen sulfide-releasing derivative of naproxen, a commonly used non-steroidal anti-inflammatory drug (NSAID). Otenaproxesul is being developed as a safer non-opiod analgesic for acute pain. Antibe is targeting the post-operative pain market and plans to broaden its application to include migraines, dysmenorrhea and dental pain. Unlike standard naproxen, Otenaproxesul does not induce damage to the gastrointestinal tract.

In May 2014, the company announced that it had completed pre-clinical studies on Otenaproxesul. In late June 2014, following approval from Health Canada, the company announced the first human dosing for Phase I of its human clinical trials. In mid-January 2015, the company announced that clinical trials for Otenaproxesul were being suspended due to safety concerns; clinical trials were restarted in March 2015.

On March 20, 2018, Antibe Therapeutics announced successful results for Phase 2B gastrointestinal safety study for Otenaproxesul. On June 1, 2020, Antibe announced positive results for Otenaproxesul in its final Phase 2 trial – a dose ranging, efficacy study. The company's second drug, an opioid-replacement for post-surgical pain, is expected to start clinical trials in late 2023.

On November 12, 2020, Antibe Therapeutics has moved to the TSX. In February 2021, Antibe announced a deal with Nuance Pharma, a Chinese pharmaceutical company, entitling them to $100 million in funding, with $20 million upfront.

== People ==
Antibe's science advisory board:

- Andre G. Buret, Professor, University of Calgary, Canada
- Giuseppe Cirino, PhD, Professor, University of Naples, Italy
- Gilberto de Nucci, MD, PhD, Professor, University of São Paulo, Brazil
- Peter B. Ernst, DVM, PhD, Professor, UCSD, San Diego, USA
- Derek Gilroy, PhD, Professor, University College, London, UK
- Richard H. Hunt, MD, Emeritus Professor, McMaster University, Canada
- Louis Ignarro, PhD Professor, UCLA, Los Angeles, USA - 1998 Nobel Prize Laureate in Medicine
- Daniel K. Podolsky, MD, President, University of Texas Southwestern Medical Center, USA
- William Sessa, PhD, Professor, Yale University, USA
- Philip M. Sherman, MD, Professor, University of Toronto, Canada

Antibe's board of directors:

- Chair - Walt Macnee, Vice Chair, MasterCard International
- Roderick Flower, Professor Emeritus, Barts and The London School of Medicine and Dentistry
- Dan Legault, CEO, Antibe Therapeutics
- Robert Hoffman, former CFO, Heron Therapeutics; Director, public biotechnology companies
- Amal Khouri, VP Business Development, Knight Therapeutics
- Jennifer McNealey, VP Investor Relations and Strategy, Calithera Biosciences
- John L. Wallace, Chief Scientific Officer, Antibe Therapeutics
- Yung Wu, CEO, MaRS Discovery District
