= Mercy Malaysia =

Non-profit organization

MERCY Malaysia
- Founded: 16 September 1999
- Founder: Tan Sri Dr Jemilah Mahmood
- Type: Non-governmental organisation
- Location: 1st Floor, MCOBA Building, 42 Jalan Syed Putra, 50460 Kuala Lumpur, Malaysia
- Field: Humanitarianism
- Patron: His Royal Highness Sultan Dr. Nazrin Muizzuddin Shah of Perak
- President: Dato' Dr. Ahmad Faizal Perdaus
- Website: mercy.org.my

MERCY Malaysia or Malaysian Medical Relief Society is a non-profit organisation focusing on providing medical relief, sustainable health related development and risk reduction activities for vulnerable communities in both crisis and non-crisis situations. As a non-profit organisation, MERCY Malaysia relies solely on funding and donations from organisations and generous individuals to continue their services to provide humanitarian assistance to beneficiaries, both in Malaysia and internationally. The organisation is a registered society according to the Societies Act 1966 in Malaysia, and the headquarters is in the capital city of Kuala Lumpur.

== History ==
=== The Early Years (1999–2003) ===
MERCY Malaysia was founded by Dr Jemilah Mahmood in 1999 in response to the conflict in Kosovo. Finding no pre-existing organisation that could sponsor her to volunteer her medical services there, she and a group of friends registered MERCY Malaysia with the Registrar of Societies with the objective of providing medical relief. Working with Helping Hands USA, MERCY Malaysia then sent a total of five missions to Kosova to provide mobile medical care. That same year, MERCY Malaysia sent relief teams to Turkey in response to the 1999 İzmit earthquake. In 2000, MERCY Malaysia provided medical assistance to the Internally Displaced Persons (IDPs) due to the Maluku sectarian conflict in Indonesia.

2001 saw the organisation responding to the medical needs of the survivors of the 2001 Gujarat earthquake. In October 2001, the organisation sent a team to Afghanistan to serve the IDPs at refugee camps., while in November MERCY Malaysia responded to the survivors of the Cambodia floods in Kampong Cham. This proved to be one of the earlier tests of governance and decision-making for MERCY Malaysia's operational priorities. Ordinarily, decisions are made through consensus within the executive council, but they had to redirect their primary fundraising and networking efforts from Cambodia to Afghanistan because of widespread interest from stakeholders for the latter country. While MERCY Malaysia has asserted its apolitical stand, it was clear that public interest in Afghanistan grew after September 11 and humanitarian concerns increased after the US war on terror commenced. MERCY Malaysia partnered with Pakistan Islamic Medical Association for the Afghanistan response, while the Cambodian response was funded from MERCY Malaysia's own reserves and private sector donations.

In 2002, MERCY Malaysia continued its presence in Kabul, and later expanded its operations in Afghanistan to run the only medical centre in Spin Boldak, an area located approximately 100 km away from Kandahar. MERCY Malaysia then launched the Cambodia Relief Fund to continue to support the relief efforts due to the flooding in Mekong. The organisation also began to receive more recognition and significant fundraising and donations from external parties as it responded to the needs in Palestine.

In 2003, MERCY Malaysia responded to the needs in Baghdad, Iraq and sent its first team in January. In February, MERCY Malaysia launched its China Humanitarian Fund and sent a team in response to the 2003 Bachu earthquake, a 6.8-magnitude earthquake which struck a remote area of Xinjiang province in northwest China, near the border with Kyrgyzstan and Tajikistan. In April 2003, the MERCY Malaysia team were mistaken for hostile forces and was attacked in Iraq, where Dr Baba Deni and Dr Jemilah were both injured in the incident. May 2003 saw MERCY Malaysia responding to the 2003 Sri Lanka cyclone where the republic suffered its worst floods and landslides in 60 years. The six-person team was deployed to southern Sri Lanka to render critical medical and humanitarian aid to flood and landslide victims in Ratnapura, located about 100 km south-east of Colombo. The year closed with another mission sent to Kerman, Iran following the Bam earthquake which occurred on 26 December 2003. The nine-person team -including Dr Bubble, a hospital clown doctor- provided medical and psychosocial support to the earthquake survivors, and was stationed at the former Italian Field Hospital in Baravat, 5 km from Bam.

=== The Tipping Point (2004) ===
In the early part of 2004, MERCY Malaysia continued its work in the conflict zones, and launched a fundraising campaign in collaboration with the Ministry of Education of Malaysia to provide schoolbags for children in war-torn countries like Palestine, Afghanistan and Iraq. For Iraq in particular, MERCY Malaysia allocated RM1 million in medical and humanitarian aid, and collaborated with Islamic Relief to transport three trucks of humanitarian aid to Falluja. MERCY Malaysia then responded to North Korea's appeal for international aid following the collision and explosion the train in Ryongchon disaster., where the three-person team brought along medical supplies worth RM50,000.

The organisation started gaining more recognition for its humanitarian work, receiving five nominations for the NSTP-PwC Young Humanitarian Award, and in July, Dr Jemilah Mahmood was appointed the first president of National Federation of Non-Governmental Organisations for Disaster Relief Malaysia (NFNDRM).

In July, MERCY Malaysia responded to a request from the United Nations (UN) agencies to lend medical assistance to the IDPs in Sudan. After the initial assessment, MERCY Malaysia kick-started the fundraising for the Maternity and Child Health Clinic for the women in El-Geneina in West Darfur. In addition, MERCY Malaysia also constructed shelters for relatives of patients at the El-Geneina Hospital, as well as a feeding centre to cater to the patients' nutritional needs.

MERCY Malaysia concluded its rehabilitation of the Ibn Al-Quff Hospital and the Al-Mansoor Paediatric Teaching Hospital in Iraq, and delivered essential items to the Internally Displaced Persons (IDPs) in Fallujah as winter arrived. Another reconstruction project in Bam, Iran, was also officiated. The new health centre, financed by the people and government of Malaysia, was designed to cater for the city's 130,000 people and treat up to 200 patients a day. Early December 2004 saw MERCY Malaysia responding to the humanitarian needs in the Philippines to assist the survivors of the tropical storms, which had left some 1,000 dead.

The 2004 Indian Ocean earthquake and tsunami in December was a major tipping point for the organisation. "We were the first international organisation to arrive (in Aceh) and it was publicised by the international media. Suddenly, people realised there was MERCY Malaysia," Dr Jemilah said. MERCY Malaysia deployed teams to Aceh and Sri Lanka, as well as assisting the tsunami survivors on the home front in Penang, Malaysia.

=== A Period of Rapid Growth (2005–2007) ===
2005: The Aftermath of the Tsunami, and Coping with Other Disasters

The earlier part of 2005 was occupied with the humanitarian response due to the tsunami, and MERCY Malaysia readily admitted that the scale of the disaster had stretched their operations to the limits. Public support was overwhelming, and donations flowed in the form of financial assistance as well as donations in-kind such as body bags and clothes. In-kind donations became unmanageable at one point when irrelevant and unusable items were donated, and MERCY Malaysia had to appeal to the public not to look at the organisation as a dumping ground for unwanted goods. As part of the reconstruction effort for the tsunami survivors, the organisation provided seismic-resistant homes for the refugees from Kampong Weu Raya and Sebun Ayu in Lhok Nga, as well as rebuilding the Meuraxa Community Health Centre in Banda Aceh.

The rebuilding of the houses for the people of Kampong Weu Raya proved to be a good learning experience for the organisation. Identifying actual boundaries was a difficult task, as surviving villagers had to delineate the plots of land where their houses used to be. Once construction started, the team of 30 skilled villagers and 180 construction workers from Medan managed to build at a rate of one house a day, using shorea wood and concrete. Originally designed to be 36 square metres, each unit was later expanded to 52 square metres. Discontentment arose among some of the villagers who wanted brick houses or different designs given by other NGOs. As the village was rebuilt on its original site – about 20 minutes from the Banda Aceh city centre in the north-west coastal area – it remained vulnerable to future disasters. Preparedness measures were needed, and a tsunami escape route was designed to guide the villagers towards the quickest paths to safer, higher grounds. A book was launched in 2005, entitled A Time To Heal: A Reflection of Mercy Malaysia's Response to the Indian Ocean Tsunami, to commemorate the disaster that struck on 26 December 2004. The coffee-table book relates the experiences of MERCY Malaysia's relief workers in Malaysia, Indonesia's Aceh province and Sri Lanka.

In March, MERCY Malaysia responded to the 2005 Nias–Simeulue earthquake which struck the Nias islands. October saw the organisation providing aid in response to the 2005 Kashmir earthquake which struck the Pakistan administered Kashmir known as Azad Kashmir, near the city of Muzaffarabad. A field hospital was set up, and more than seven teams were sent to serve over 400,000 survivors in the remote town of Bagh.

2006:

MERCY Malaysia handed over the Reproductive Health Unit at the El-Geneina Hospital, and a local school to the local community and exited West Darfur in March, due to lack of funds as well as escalating violence in the region. In April, Dr Jemilah Mahmood and Dr Baba Deni were conferred the title Datuk from His Royal Highness, Seri Paduka Baginda Yang di-Pertuan Agong, His Majesty's birthday for their services in Iraq.

=== 2008 and Beyond ===
In 2008, MERCY Malaysia also responded to Myanmar to aid the survivors of Cyclone Nargis.

In 2009, MERCY Malaysia deployed two-member team to Padang, Indonesia to respond to the West Sumatran earthquakes.

In 2010, MERCY Malaysia worked in partnership with Merlin UK to deliver aid in Haiti. They also responded directly in the emergency phase to the earthquake in Chile as well as the floods in Pakistan.

In 2011, MERCY Malaysia deployed teams to Tohoku earthquakes in Japan, war-torn Somalia, earthquake ravaged Turkey and also to aid those affected by the floods in Thailand.

In 2012, MERCY Malaysia had deployed teams into Rakhine, Myanmar, where they distributed non-food items and established mobile clinics to help the IDP's, to Mindanao, Philippines, to respond to those affected by both Tropical Storm Washi and Typhoon Bopha, and they had also sent in their assessment team to help Syrian refugees there. MERCY Malaysia also launched its first official efforts in sustainable funding under the banner of Seringgit Sehari.

In 2014, MERCY Malaysia sent aid to Gaza.

In 2015, MERCY Malaysia's Sierra Leone for the Ebola Recovery Project and hygiene kits distribution to the selected beneficiaries.

In 2016, MERCY Malaysia in Bekaa Valley, Lebanon to aid the Syrian refugees due to the protracted war in Syria.

In 2016, MERCY Malaysia's assessment mission in Musan County, North Korea that was affected by floods on 31 August 2016.

In 2016, MERCY Malaysia enters Internally Displaced People (IDPs) camp in Idlib Syria for humanitarian mission – 28 December 2016.

In 2016, MERCY Malaysia enters Gaza (to be the first NGO to enter Gaza via Rafah, Egypt after two years) to follow up on projects and programs.

In 2017, MERCY Malaysia is Sittwe and Northern Rakhine, Myanmar for humanitarian aids.

In 2017–2018, MERCY Malaysia is in Cox's Bazar, Bangladesh for emergency response and also manage to set up Mothers and Child Health Center (MCHC) in the Rohingya refugee camps.

In response to the Gaza war, Mercy Malaysia stated that it was exploring opportunities to provide health assistance, psychosocial support, and medical supplies in Gaza.

== 2020 COVID-19 pandemic response in Malaysia ==
In 2020 MERCY Malaysia launched its COVID-19 Pandemic Fund to support medical services and the essential needs of marginalised groups within the country. This dedicated fund is to implement the COVID-19 Strategic Preparedness and Response Plan – a plan for humanitarian assistance to be delivered within a continuous cycle of total disaster risk management that focuses on prevention; preparedness; response; and recovery. All aid assistance and deliverables are coordinated with Ministry of Health (Malaysia) and the National Crisis Preparedness and Response Centre (CPRC), and the National Agency for Disaster Management (NADMA). MERCY Malaysia received RM4 mil from Maybank and another RM10mil from 11 member banks of the Association of Banks in Malaysia (ABM) for its Pandemic Fund. Costa Coffee donated RM6000 to purchase equipment to ensure supplies are available to communities currently facing difficulties getting fresh food caused by the restricted movement. Together with two other NGOs, MERCY Malaysia also partnered with Lazada Malaysia to facilitate the donation of funds through digital giving.

A national COVID-19 psychosocial support hotline was initially set up by MERCY Malaysia and CPRC and subsequently linked to the Women's Aid Organisation's (WAO) domestic violence hotline. WAO's 14 active crisis support officers and additional staff complemented the 19 psychosocial volunteers from MERCY Malaysia and 10 counsellors from the Health Ministry who were operating the hotline, in anticipation of the increase in the number of calls received as many at-risk women and children find themselves confined in the same houses as perpetrators, unable to work or go to school during the 2020 Malaysia movement control order. It was reported that 46.8 percent of the calls were psychologically related, as people began to be retrenched due to the pandemic and economic stresses translates to poor mental health.

MERCY Malaysia also had to reassure the stateless people from the Rohingya community to come forward for testing as they fear arrests from authorities upon seeking medical attention. There was an increase in animosity from the public towards the community and there were online petitions calling for the deportation of Rohingya people and for Myanmar to take up responsibility for their welfare. In addition to the negative sentiment within Malaysian society, it was known that many Rohingya Muslims attended the event that became the 2020 Tablighi Jamaat COVID-19 hotspot in Malaysia, and contact tracing efforts by MERCY Malaysia was done in collaboration with the United Nations High Commissioner for Refugees (UNHCR), Islamic Medical Association of Malaysia (IMARET), Malaysian Relief Agency (MRA), CPRC, Ministry of Health (MOH) and Taiwan Buddhist Tzu Chi Foundation (Tzu Chi). Assistance and support was given to the Rohingya people found to be COVID-19 positive by ensuring that their family members were quarantined and given food aid.

Recognising that there are many undocumented migrant workers who may also fear arrests due to the legality of their status, MERCY Malaysia echoed the call for an amnesty made by the Malaysian Bar, together with manufacturers and NGOs such as the Federation of Malaysian Manufacturers and Tenaganita to guarantee that COVID-19 testing can be done without the threat of detention and deportation.

== Governance ==
In compliance with the Societies Act 1966, MERCY Malaysia submits its accounts to an external auditor, publishes its Annual Report for review and holds an Annual General Meeting for all members, usually in the month of June of every year.

The structure and governance of the society is outlined by the Constitution of MERCY Malaysia.

=== Patron ===
The patron of MERCY Malaysia is His Royal Highness Sultan Dr. Nazrin Muizzuddin Shah of Perak. According to Article 17 of the Constitution, "A Patron of the Society, subject to his/her consent, shall be a distinguished person as may be appointed by a resolution of a General Meeting."

=== Board of trustees ===
MERCY Malaysia currently has six trustees on its board.

Tan Sri Dato' Ajit Singh, a former Malaysian Diplomat currently serves as the chairman of the board.

According to Article 16 of the Constitution, the trustees are empowered to "ensure good governance of the Society including, but not limited to, matters pertaining to governance, financial health, audit and asset management of the Society."

As MERCY Malaysia is not a registered company, its ability to acquire assets are restricted by the Societies Act. However, with the provisions in Article 19, which outlines the scope of Investment Towards Self-Sufficiency, the organisation -through the board of trustees- "has the power to own land, to apply for and acquire land, to lease, charge and discharge land, erect and own buildings on land acquired."

=== Executive Council ===
According to Article 8 of the Constitution, The executive council shall consist of;

1. A president; who shall be a medical doctor
2. Two vice-presidents, of which vice-president I shall be a medical professional and vice-president II who is not a medical professional;
3. An honorary secretary;
4. An assistant honorary secretary;
5. An honorary treasurer; and
6. Three ordinary council members, of which at least one (1) shall be a member who is a medical professional.

=== Society member ===
According to Article 6, there are two types of memberships that allows for voting rights in the Annual General Meeting; Ordinary Members and Life Members. The difference is defined in the fees paid to the society.

Another type of membership available is Honorary Membership. Since this category seeks to honour individuals who have directly or indirectly contributed to the organisation's objectives, and nominations are made by the executive council, honorary members are not entitled to vote at the Annual General Meeting.

=== Secretariat ===
According to Article 11, "The Society shall have a Secretariat consisting of an Executive Director and a number of officers, all employed by the Society either on a permanent or contract basis."

The secretariat is responsible for executing decisions made by the executive council, where the executive director reports to the executive council on a regular basis.

To avoid conflict of interest, no member of the executive council shall at the same time be employed as a member of the secretariat. This distinction is also necessary as the executive council are nominated by society members. The officers in the secretariat are employed by the organisation, and as such their relationship with the organisation is governed by their employment contract and the Labour Law of Malaysia.

== Accountability ==
In 2004, MERCY Malaysia made its financial reporting available to the public through the publication of its annual reports. The organisation also won Special Mention in the ACCA Malaysia Environmental and Social Reporting Awards (MESRA) for Social Reporting by an NGO, for the years 2006 and 2007.

In 2007, MERCY Malaysia became the third NGO in the world (and first in Asia) to get a Humanitarian Accountability Partnership (HAP) certification.

== Change of Leadership ==
On 3 August 2009, Dato' Dr. Ahmad Faizal Mohd. Perdaus took over the position of president of MERCY Malaysia from Tan Sri Dr. Jemilah Mahmood.
