= Humanitarian-Development Nexus =

Humanitarian concept

The Humanitarian-Development Nexus is the concept of increased collaboration between organizations working in short term humanitarian aid and long term international development promoted since 2016.

The concept is supported by European governments, but has been met with both praise and criticism by humanitarian practitioners.

== Background ==
Traditionally, the two areas of humanitarian aid and international development have operated separately, with the former working on short-term life saving goals and the later working towards longer-term objectives including the Millennium Development Goals. Humanitarian organizations follow the humanitarian principle of independence from government action, in contrast to international development work which is done in close proximity with governments.

== Launch ==
The concept of the Humanitarian-Development Nexus came to prominence at the 2016 at the World Humanitarian Summit when it was promoted by government funders of humanitarian aid. At the summit, it was stated by government donors that collaboration between humanitarian agencies, and international development actors, should be encouraged and programs that work towards addressing humanitarian needs and longer-term development goals should be funded.

=== Critical reception ===
The encouragement of humanitarian aid agencies working closer with international development institutions was met with strong resistance by the United Nations High Commissioner for Refugees, Médecins Sans Frontières, and the International Committee of the Red Cross, with the later two expressing concern about contradictions between the Nexus and humanitarian principles.

== Triple Nexus ==
In February 2019, the OECD stated their collective intent to fund complimentary humanitarian, development, and peacebuilding actions.

=== Critical reception of the Triple Nexus ===
The New Humanitarian reported concerns of tension between the humanitarian imperative of working independent from government, and of the risk that by trying to do three things simultaneously each would be done badly. Lorenzo Angelini of the European Peacebuilding Liaison Office expressed concern about varying definitions of peacebuilding, specifically the common confusion with use of military force.

Both the UK's Department for International Development and German's Federal Foreign Office expressed enthusiasm for the commitment to the Triple Nexus.

Harvard Humanitarian Initiative's analysis of applying the Triple Nexus approach in Mali concluded that humanitarian organizations should push in the "opposite direction" of the Triple Nexus, and recommended a "urgent introspection" of the new way of working.
