= John L. Wallace =

Medical scientist

Adjunct Professor, University of Calgary

Personal details
- Born: 25 September 1956 (age 70) Toronto, Ontario, Canada
- Education: Queen's University; University of Toronto; University of Birmingham
- Profession: Pharmaceutical Research Scientist
- Website: Faculty | John L. Wallace

John L. Wallace (born September 25, 1956) is a medical scientist and was the founder of the Inflammation Research Network at The University of Calgary and inaugural director of the Farncombe Institute at McMaster University.

In November 2013, he became the tenth recipient of the Heymans Foundation Memorial Medal. Since its inauguration in 1972, the Medal had been awarded twelve times; six of the recipients are Nobel Laureates. Wallace is also the 2009 recipient of the Premier's Summit Award in Innovation, Canada's largest value research award (C$5 million) aimed at supporting the work of an individual scientist.

He is a fellow of the Royal Society of Canada, a member of the Brazilian Academy of Sciences, a fellow of the British Pharmacological Society, and a fellow and former president of the Canadian Association of Gastroenterology. Wallace is an adjunct professor in the Faculty of Medicine at the University of Calgary, the Department of Pharmacology and Toxicology at the University of Toronto, and in the University Camilo Castelo Branco in São Paulo, Brazil.

He was the Chief Scientific Officer of Antibe Therapeutics Inc., which he founded. Antibe Therapeutics was based in Toronto, Ontario, Canada, and traded on the Toronto Stock Exchange (TSX:ATE), before it went bankrupt in 2025.

John L. Wallace is a citizen of Canada, The Republic of Ireland and the United Kingdom.

== Research focus ==
Wallace's current research focuses on the mechanisms of internal injury induced by non-steroidal anti-inflammatory drugs (NSAIDs) and other anti-inflammatory drugs. In parallel, Wallace has been investigating the factors that regulate and promote healing of ulcers. He is also researching the causes of inflammatory bowel disease (Crohn's disease and ulcerative colitis).

== Career ==
Wallace's career has centred on the use of gaseous mediators to treat inflammation, particularly intestinal injury and dysfunction. Wallace has published more than 500 peer-reviewed papers and is among the top 0.5 percent of biomedical scientists worldwide in citations (> 42,000), with a current Hirsch index of 110.

From 1989 to 2009, Wallace was a professor of Pharmacology and Therapeutics at the University of Calgary, where he held the Canada Research Chair in Inflammation. In 2005, he acted as an invited expert for the US Food and Drug Administration's review of COX-2 inhibitors such as Vioxx.

Wallace graduated from Queen's University with his BSc and MSc and received his PhD from the University of Toronto. He completed his post-doctoral studies under Dr. Brendan Whittle, Sir John Vane and Sir Salvador Moncada at Wellcome Research Laboratories in the UK. From 1986 to 1989, he was an assistant professor at Queen's University. In 1989, he joined the University of Calgary, where he founded the Inflammation Research Network and held the Crohn's and Colitis Foundation of Canada Chair in Intestinal Disease Research. Wallace received an MBA from the University of Birmingham (UK) in 2008. In 2014, Wallace co-founded the Inflammation Research Network of Canada.

Wallace co-founded NicOx in 1996, creating the first pharmaceutical company to commercialize gaseous mediator technology. Dr Wallace was chair of NicOx's Scientific Advisory Board from 1996 to 2003, which included Nobel Laureates Bengt Samuelsson and Louis Ignarro. This board oversaw the development of nitric oxide-releasing NSAIDs. He is also the founder of Antibe Therapeutics, which is developing a gaseous mediator drug development platform based on hydrogen sulfide.
