= Humanitarian Networks and Partnerships Weeks =

Annual United Nations event

- Genre: Humanitarian aid
- Frequency: Annual
- Locations: Geneva and online
- Years active: Since 2015
- Secretariat: United Nations Office for the Coordination of Humanitarian Affairs
- Organizer: The Leading Edge Programme
- Website: http://www.hnpw.org/

Humanitarian Networks and Partnerships Weeks (HNPW) is an annual event organized the United Nations Office for the Coordination of Humanitarian Affairs.

The event is a forum for people who work in humanitarian aid to collaborate on challenges and solutions in their work. It takes place in Geneva and has been running since 2015.

== Nomenclature ==
The event was originally a one week long and was called the Humanitarian Networks and Partnerships Week. In 2021, due to the COVID-19 pandemic, the event switched to online modality, and the event titles changed "week" to "weeks".

== Purpose ==
The HNPW is a forum where humanitarian aid practitioners and researchers can meet and discuss challenges to their work and collaborate on solutions. Topics include safety, coordination, logistics, information management.

== Attendees ==
Attendees include staff from United Nations agencies, government, military, academia, humanitarian organizations, the Red Cross Movement, and civil society groups.

== Organisers ==
The event is organised by the Leading Edge Programme, who took over from the Consultative Group for Emergency Preparedness and Response in 2017. The Leading Edge Programme's secretariat is the United Nations Office for the Coordination of Humanitarian Affairs.

== History ==
The first event took place in 2015 and in 2021 switched from a week long in-person event to a three-week online mode in 2021.

During the 2021 online event there were almost 250 topics, including localisastion, the climate crisis, and better encouraging anticipatory action in areas prone to humanitarian emergencies.
