= Adeso =

Kenyan humanitarian NGO

- Predecessor: Horn Relief
- Formation: 1991
- Founder: Fatima Jibrell
- Type: nonprofit organization
- Purpose: Humanitarian and development work
- Headquarters: Nairobi, Kenya
- Region served: Horn of Africa, East Africa
- Executive Director: Degan Ali
- Staff: ~300
- Website: www.adesoafrica.org

Adeso (previously Horn Relief) is Nairobi-based humanitarian non-governmental organization founded in 1991. Its current leader, Degal Ali, joined the organization in 2003 and became executive director in 2006. Ali is an outspoken advocate against traditional aid organizations to allow local organizations to exercise more power and is the daughter of the organization's founder, Fatima Jibrell.

The organisation is noted for its use of cash-based programming to support communities in Somalia and Kenya and for its executive director's advocacy efforts around advancing localisation. Its programs in Somalia, Kenya, and South Sudan also include women's literacy, agricultural support, and community environmental education.

== Nomenclature and history ==
Adeso is a portmanteau of Africa Development Solutions.

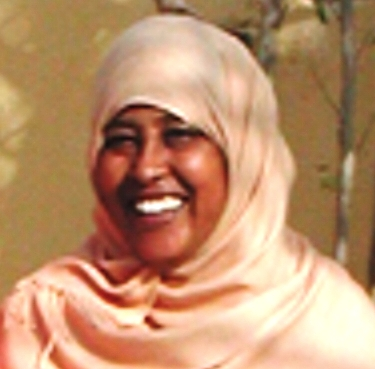
Founder Fatima Jibrell

Adeso was founded in Connecticut, in 1991 by environmental activist Fatima Jibrell. Adeso was initially known as Horn of Africa Relief and Development Organization, with a mandate to provide a response to humanitarian needs in Somalia in the context of the Somali civil war and its effects on Jibrell's homeland of Somalia. Initial activities included the protection of acacia trees and old growth forest against logging for charcoal.

In 1998, the organization changed its name to Horn Relief.

In 2002, in response to Jibrell's advocacy work, the Puntland Government banned the export of charcoal in the region. The same year, Jibrell won the international Goldman Environmental Prize for Africa.

The organisation implemented the first large-scale cash transfer program in Somalia in 2003.

In 2006, Jibrell retired as executive director, and was succeeded by her daughter Degan Ali. The following year, Jibrell won the National Geographic's Buffett Award for Leadership in African Conservation, and the organisation published a cash transfer implementation manual. Also in 2006, the organisation launched a women's literary program in Sanaag, Somaliland. The program was initially met with some resistance from people who objected to women's education on religious grounds, however staff defended the move by arguing that Koranic verses supported the education of women.

The organisation changed its name to Adeso in 2012. Somalian-American actor Barkhad Abdi joined Adeso as a voluntary Goodwill Ambassador in 2014.

In 2019, Adeso pushed for a shift of power towards locally-community run humanitarian organisations. Adeso was one of the 286 organisations chosen by MacKenzie Scott in 2021 to receive part of her US$2.7 billion in pilot donations which served as a forerunner of Yield Giving. The organization planned to use the donation of $5 million to establish an endowment. Adeso has also received funds from the Bill & Melinda Gates Foundation.

== Activities ==
A significant part of Adeso's work is the delivery of cash assistance, which is often provided to pastoralists. Cash is used by people to pay off debt, and meeting their basic education and healthcare needs. Adeso adopts an "Inclusive Community-Based Targeting" approach to its activities, adjusting to local cultural and religious norms, respecting the traditional community hierarchy and role of elders and communities leaders who form Village Relief Committees. The committees are obliged to consist of at least 40% women. The committee meets in a public space (in what is known locally as a kulan) and discusses the needs of each potential program beneficiary and then does house-to-house verification of unmet humanitarian needs. This process improves local community ownership of the program and means that the needs assessment, while slower than traditional humanitarian aid, is done by people with the best local knowledge.

Other program activities include women's literacy, cash-for-work programs, and agriculture programs that provide seeds and tools to pastoralists Adeso's community education about environment covers the impacts of charcoal use small scale irrigation.

Advocacy efforts cover topics such as illegal overfishing in Somali waters and the importance of allowing cash remittances into Somalia.

Activities are centred around the Sool and Sanaag regions of Somali and extend also into Kenya and South Sudan.

== Organization ==
Adeso has its headquarters in Nairobi, Kenya, and is registered as a charity in the United Kingdom, Kenya, and the United States. There are approximately 45 staff in the Nairobi head office and nearly 250 staff in field offices. The 2012 revenues for Adeso were $25 million.

== Controversies ==
In March 2026, an investigation by The New Humanitarian reported that Adeso faced a governance crisis marked by internal disputes, allegations of workplace bullying, and financial oversight concerns. Former staff members described a workplace culture characterized by intimidation and fear, which critics said contrasted with the organization’s public advocacy for decolonising aid. The report also noted that at least six members of Adeso’s board resigned in 2024, with some citing resistance from leadership when attempting to review the organization’s finances and debts. In addition, the investigation highlighted external scrutiny of the organization’s management practices, including a three-year suspension from European Union funding over findings of “grave professional misconduct” and legal claims from U.S. and European authorities involving millions of dollars. Adeso’s leadership disputed aspects of the allegations and said steps were being taken to address governance issues.

== See also ==
- Network for Empowered Aid Response
