= Otenaproxesul =

Chemical compound

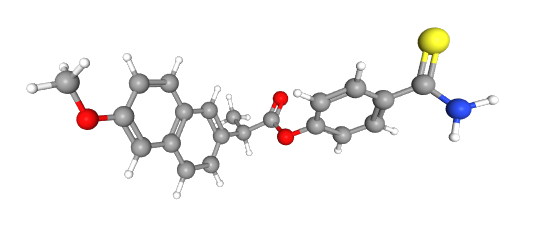

Clinical data
- Other names: ATB-352
- Routes of administration: By mouth
- ATC code: None

Legal status
- Legal status: US: Investigational New Drug

Identifiers
- IUPAC name: 4-Carbamothioylphenyl (2S)-2-(6-methoxy-2-naphthyl)propanoate
- CAS Number: 1000700-29-7
- PubChem CID: 25065981
- ChemSpider: 32701263
- UNII: V44GCU5P5O
- ChEMBL: ChEMBL4211107
- CompTox Dashboard (EPA): DTXSID201336751

Chemical and physical data
- Formula: C_{21}H_{19}NO_{3}S
- Molar mass: 365.45 g·mol^{−1}
- 3D model (JSmol): Interactive image
- SMILES: COC1=CC2=CC=C(C=C2C=C1)C(C)C(=O)OC3=CC=C(C=C3)C(N)=S
- InChI: InChI=1S/C21H19NO3S/c1-13(21(23)25-18-8-5-14(6-9-18)20(22)26)15-3-4-17-12-19(24-2)10-7-16(17)11-15/h3-13H,1-2H3,(H2,22,26)/t13-/m0/s1; Key:YCNMAPLPQYQJFC-ZDUSSCGKSA-N

Otenaproxesul is a analgesic and anti-inflammatory drug being developed by Antibe Therapeutics. An NSAID structurally derived from naproxen, in 2016 it received approval to commence phase II clinical trials as a treatment for osteoarthritis after completing phase I clinical trials in 2015. In 2018, the drug completed trials for gastrointestinal safety, and in 2020 completed phase IIb trials on efficacy of pain reduction. Initial phase III clinical trials in 2021 failed to meet the necessary criteria to advance to the next phase.

Other in vivo studies have demonstrated a reduction in zymosan-induced pain and inflammation and cytokine-induced bone loss. Preclinical studies have also investigated the treatment of melanoma, intestinal cancer, and periodontitis.

== Pharmacology ==
Like other NSAIDs, otenaproxesul acts as an inhibitor of the cycloxygenase (COX) enzymes, suppressing the production of prostaglandins. Additionally, it releases hydrogen sulfide in the gastrointestinal tract, reducing gastrointestinal adverse effects such as ulcers.
