= ACAPS =

Norwegian non-profit, non-governmental project

ACAPS is a non-profit, non-governmental project that provides international, independent humanitarian analysis. Founded in 2009, ACAPS provides daily monitoring and analysis of the situations in 150 countries, to support humanitarian aid workers. This analysis is freely provided to the NGOs, UN agencies and donors. ACAPS is also known for having developed a severity ranking of humanitarian crises. It employs around 30 professionals based in Geneva.

ACAPS established the Syria Needs Analysis Project (SNAP) in 2012. For about three years, SNAP delivered over 40 products related to the humanitarian impact of the conflict.

== History ==
ACAPS (initially known as "The Assessment Capacities Project") was established in 2009 to improve the assessment of humanitarian needs in complex emergencies and crises, at a time where there were no single approach, nor consensus on needs assessments and where evidence- and needs-based approaches were not standard.

Through the development of methodological tools, the delivery of training and operational support (such as Bangladesh in 2012 and Nepal Earthquake in 2015) ACAPS contributed to shape norms and standards around coordinated needs assessment and advocated for more meaningful and evidence-based data.

ACAPS was a contributor to the MIRA process (Multi-Cluster/Sector Initial Rapid Assessment) which is a joint needs assessment tool that can be used in sudden-onset emergencies.

Between December 2012 and 30 June 2015 ACAPS and MapAction ran the Strategic Needs Analysis Project — SNAP (initially the Syria Needs Analysis Project). The aim was to support the humanitarian response in Syria and the region with independent analysis and coordinated assessments. For almost three years, SNAP pursued these goals with a combination of independent information products, technical support and capacity building for humanitarian assessments. Its data and products were broadly used by humanitarian workers and also journalists, such as BBC and the New York Times.

After the SNAP project ACAPS ran several other field projects, such as the Ebola Needs Assessment Project (ENAP) in 2014–2015, the Refugee/Migrant Crisis in 2015–2016, together with MapAction, the Caribbean response to the Hurricane Irma and Maria, and more recently the support to the Rohingya crisis.

In 2014 ACAPS together with the Emergency Capacity Building Project (ECB) launched "Humanitarian Needs Assessment — The Good Enough Guide ", a tool dedicated to ease field staff carrying out assessment after a humanitarian crisis. This guide received praise for enabling field-based staff and national responders 'to provide the critical information needed to inform the wider humanitarian community."

In 2016 ACAPS, together with six other INGOs, joined the Mixed Migration platform (MMP), a joint NGO initiative providing quality mixed migration-related information for policy, programming and advocacy work, as well as critical information for people on the move. ACAPS contributes to the MMP with analytical capacity, scenario-building expertise, and online data collection and analysis.

Over the years, ACAPS centred its core services on humanitarian analysis and the provision of secondary data. Although ACAPS still undertakes and supports field needs assessments (and primary data collection) and produce needs assessment tools, the majority of its work is dedicated to support the humanitarian community by providing up-to-date information on more than 40 key crises around the globe. The ACAPS website, and its related app, CrisisAlert, released in 2017, are the main platforms to present this analysis to the humanitarian community.

At the recent World Humanitarian Summit in Istanbul, "joint and impartial needs assessments" were promoted as one of the 10 key commitments of the Grand Bargain giving ACAPS new opportunities to play a central role and contribute to change the humanitarian sector.

== Activities ==
=== Crisis analysis ===
ACAPS performs crisis analysis, monitoring and updating current crises on a daily basis. They rank the severity of world humanitarian crises on a weekly basis. Tailored reports, such as the Briefing Notes for the START Fund, are also released.

=== Forecasting ===
Since 2015 ACAPS has developed a range of products and services to better anticipate events and humanitarian developments. These services should contribute to inform timely contingency planning and preparedness measures. ACAPS writes risks reports, anticipatory briefing notes and organizes scenario building workshops, such as the one for IFRC, held in April 2017. The result of this exercise is a report with a set of key scenarios including an overview of events that could trigger the scenario, humanitarian consequences and impact, estimated caseload, operational constraints and recommended actions. Every year, in December, ACAPS releases its annual publication, the "Humanitarian Overview", identifying key crises and corresponding needs to look at in the upcoming year.

=== Methodology development ===
ACAPS has developed material around humanitarian assessments and analysis, which ranges from decision-making to initial planning of analysis work. The importance of better collecting secondary data (instead of only collecting primary data) and the importance of better analysing fewer data rather than compiling a maximum of information without making sense of it are some of the changes ACAPS made into the humanitarian system. ACAPS is also known for having developed a severity ranking of humanitarian crises. Categories are: severe humanitarian crises, humanitarian crises and situation of concern. This ranking is based on 5 indicators.

More than 100 methodological tools and guidance have been produced by ACAPS.

=== API/webservices ===
ACAPS is currently openly sharing its data with various organizations, through an API service. Among them, the Crises App from ReliefWeb uses the ACAPS "Crisis Overview" section for each crisis displayed on its own app.

== Funding ==
Since its launch ACAPS has been funded by various institutional donors. The project is currently funded by the Norwegian Ministry of Foreign Affairs, the Swiss Agency for Development and Cooperation (SDC), the UK Department for International Development (DFID), and The Directorate-General for European Civil Protection and Humanitarian Aid Operations (ECHO) among others.
