= Rahul Chandran =

Policy analyst (born 1976)

Rahul Chandran (born 1976) is the first executive director of the Global Alliance for Humanitarian Innovation. GAHI was a major outcome of the World Humanitarian Summit. He was previously a thought leader on United Nations reform, working across the fields of development, conflict, and security, widely known for his work on resilience, statebuilding, and humanitarian change.

Chandran was the author and managing editor of Humanitarianism in the Network Age, a major report on the future of humanitarian action The report argued that information was a basic need in crisis response and was described as ground-breaking and a "turning point for the use of mobile and ICT in humanitarian crises and the protection of human rights".

Chandran has also led various efforts on UN reform, including around the Sustainable Development Goals, and the International Review of Civilian Capacity Secretariat, a reform process for the United Nations.

Before this, Chandran was the deputy director at the Center on International Cooperation(CIC). At CIC, Chandran, along with the Director, Bruce D. Jones, and Richard Gowan, helped to make CIC one of the most influential think-tanks working on conflict and security issues. While at CIC, Chandran ran the Afghanistan Reconstruction Program, working for Barnett Rubin before his appointment as Senior Advisor to Richard Holbrooke.

Chandran was the lead author of From Fragility to Resilience, a policy paper for the Organization for Economic Cooperation and Development (OECD) that provided new definitions for State-building and resilience. The paper was highly influential in the world of conflict policy. First, it restored the idea that political settlement was essential to social contract stability. Second, it defined building resilience as the goal of international assistance to conflict countries. Third, it renewed the focus on legitimacy. This work has been taken forward in several other fora – on political settlements most notably by Alan Whaites and DfiD, as well as the World Bank's 2011 World Development Report, and on legitimacy by the OECD's International Network on Conflict and Fragility.

Chandran was also the lead author of Recovering From War a report commissioned by the UK Government ahead of its 20 May 2008 thematic debate in the United Nations Security Council. Recovering from War defined three primary weaknesses in the international response to conflict:

- A strategy gap – observing "no evidence of a strategy that encompassed political, security, development, and humanitarian tools across bilateral and multi-lateral actors; and no framework for prioritization."
- A financing gap – noting that financing "instruments are neither flexible nor dynamic."
- A series of capacity gaps – in leadership capacity; in implementation capacity; in sheer availability of civilian resources, and in a lack of training for the purpose.

These findings formed the basis of then Prime Minister Gordon Brown's address to the Security Council, and the subsequent debate. They have also launched a series of processes to address these, with considerable success on the capacity gap through the Review of Civilian Capacities; some progress on the financing gap through the OECD/DAC process on financing and aid architecture; and negligible process on the strategy gap.

Chandran has previously worked for the World Bank on participatory monitoring and evaluation issues, and for the UN in Afghanistan, where he wrote a popular Diaries Diaries column for Slate. Before this, he had a successful private sector career, involved with ESPNCricinfo and Rely Software. He was also a paralegal on Pigford v. Glickman one of the largest civil rights actions in US history.

Chandran currently serves on the Expert Advisory Group of the Partnership for Democratic Governance for whom he wrote Statebuilding and Government Consolidation in Situations of Fragility, and the Consortium Advisory Group for DfID's Secure livelihoods research consortium.

== Education ==
Chandran is a graduate of Yale University and the Fletcher School of Law and Diplomacy.

== Selected publications ==
- Chandran, Rahul (2015). It's Broke, So Fix It: Humanitarian Response in Crisis. United Nations.
- Chandran, Rahul (2011). Civilian capacity in the aftermath of conflict. United Nations.
- Chandran, Rahul; Jones, Bruce (2008). Recovering from war (PDF). Center on International Cooperation. Archived from the original (PDF) on 2011-10-01.
- Chandran, Rahul; Jones, Bruce (2009). Rapid deployment of civilians in peace operations. Government of Denmark.
- Forman, Shepard; Sorensen, Gigja; Chandran, Rahul. Taking Stock, Looking Forward: A field-based review of the Peacebuilding Commission
- Chandran, Rahul. "Statebuilding and government consolidation in situations of fragility" (PDF). OECD.
- Chandran, Rahul; Jones, Bruce (2008). "From Fragility to Resilience". GSDRC. University of Birmingham, 2008.
