= Walt Macnee =

Canadian business leader

Walter Minnes Macnee (usually Walt Macnee) is a Canadian business leader who was part of the United Nations High Level Panel on Humanitarian Financing.

Macnee is the chairman of Antibe Therapeutics and the vice chairman of Mastercard. He founded the Mastercard Center for Inclusive Growth.

Before becoming a business leader, Macnee taught Jim Cuddy how to play the guitar.

== Education ==
Macnee has a bachelor's degree and a bachelors of education degree from Queen's University. He also has an MBA from York University.

== Career ==
Macnee is the vice chairman of Mastercard, and previously has served as the president of international markets, the president of global markets, the president of the Americas region, and the president of Mastercard Canada. He left the employment of Mastercard from 2004 to 2006 while he worked as the executive vice president of the Canadian Imperial Bank of Commerce. Prior to working at Mastercard, he worked at Toronto-Dominion Bank as a senior vice president, starting in 1983 and moving to Mastercard in 2001. At Mastercard, Macnee launched the Mastercard Center for Inclusive Growth. Macnee was part of a 2015 business delegation, led by New York governor Andrew Cuomo, to Cuba where he met twice with the Cuba's central bank to discuss the acceptance of US credit cards in Cuba.

In 2015, he was part of the United Nations High Level Panel on Humanitarian Financing.

He is also currently the chair of Convergence Finance (corporation), the Queen's University's Centre for Social Impact, and Antibe Therapeutics.

Macnee has served on the board of directors of Save the Children Canada, the Sunnybrook Hospital Foundation, Big Brothers Big Sisters of Canada, and the Royal Conservatory of Music.

== Personal life ==
Macnee lives in Toronto.

Before he was a business leader, Macnee taught Jim Cuddy how to play the guitar.
