= Localisation (humanitarian practice) =

Practice of supporting aid organisations local to an emergency

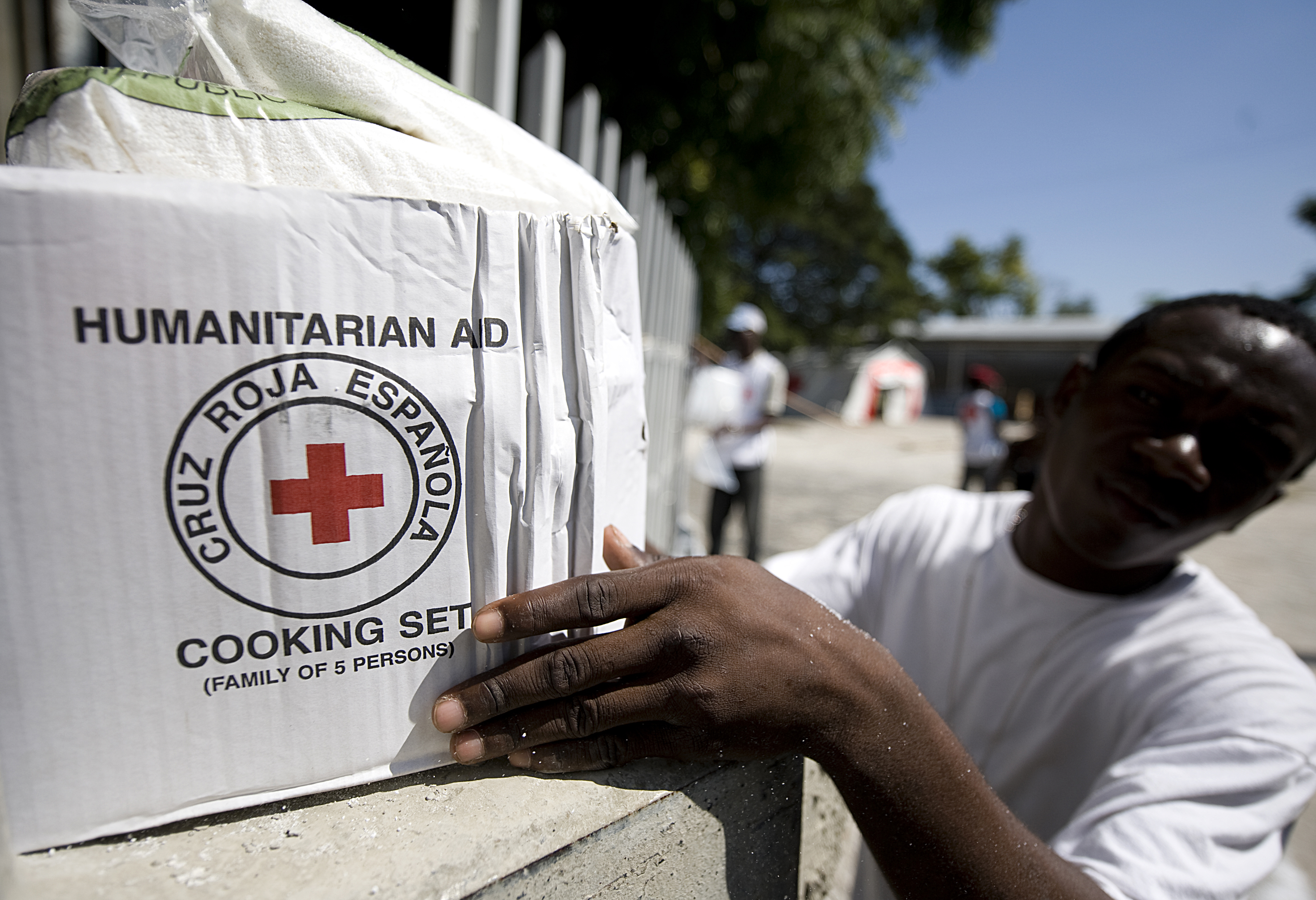
Humanitarian Aid being distributed in Haiti

Localisation (or localization) is the practice, in humanitarian aid, to give more decision making power and funding to organizations and people that are based in countries affected by humanitarian emergencies.

The tendency of humanitarian aid agencies to promote Europeans and North Americans into leadership roles, limits the number of leadership positions filled by people with first hand experience of living in an emergency.

The need to localise was agreed upon by governments and humanitarian organizations in 2016, at the World Humanitarian Summit meeting in Turkey. Localisation was promoted by the United Nations Office for the Coordination of Humanitarian Affairs in 2017, as part of a wider series of reforms called the "New Way of Working".

A target to increase the percentage of global spending on humanitarian aid flowing directly to local organizations to 25% by 2020 was not reached.

== Nomenclature ==
There is lack of consensus between humanitarian practitioners and scholars in defining localisation, with some believing that the definition should vary depending on the country and emergency.

Most commonly, localisation is understood to mean the practice, in humanitarian aid, of giving donor funding to aid agencies that are geographically located close to an emergency. The practice also includes increasing the number of people from communities affected by emergencies in senior leadership roles at humanitarian aid organizations.

== Background ==
Humanitarian aid agencies tend to employ European and North Americans into senior leadership roles and tend to hire staff from countries more commonly affected by crises into more junior, local roles, blocking local staff from senior leadership roles. This tendency prevents people from local communities from influencing decision making about emergency responses to disasters.

Among humanitarian professionals, there is a widespread perception that increasing localisation will improve the quality of humanitarian aid. Despite the logic of such perceptions, there is a lack of evidence to support the hypothesis. The lack of evidence is a barrier to increasing localiastion.

Barriers to localisation include the self-reservation incentives that international humanitarian aid agencies.

== History ==
Although the importance of local aid agencies is acknowledged by United Nations Resolution 46/182, by 2015, only 0.2% of humanitarian aid funding was allocated to local aid agencies, in contrast to national or international organisations. An emphasis on localisation in the humanitarian sector occurred at the 2016 World Humanitarian Summit. At the summit, donor governments struck an agreement, known as the Grand Bargain, to increase that percentage to 25%. In 2017, the practice of localisation was promoted by United Nations Office for the Coordination of Humanitarian Affairs in their publication "New Way of Working." From 2016 and 2020 the percentage of funding that flowed to local organisations reduced from 3.5% to 2.1%. In 2020, Degan Ali, described the Grand Bargain as a "failed effort".

In 2020, Kristina Roepstorff of Otto von Guericke University Magdeburg criticised binary approaches localisation that defined people as local or western, noting complex social hierarchies and a risk of shifting power away from western humanitarians towards local elites, disconnected from the communities with needs. In 2021, the European Commissioner for Crisis Management Janez Lenarčič was criticized for comments made in an interview with The New Humanitarian in which he suggested the lack of localisation was the result of a lack of capacity amongst local aid agencies. His comments prompted criticisms from the Network for Empowered Aid Response and others who perceive the problem to be a result of those in power not relinquishing it.

Limitations on international travel during the COVID-19 pandemic increased the workload of local organisations, while also increasing safety and health risks to local staff.

Also in 2021, 60 donors took part in negotiations led by Norwegian diplomat Jan Egeland to create an updated Grand Bargain 2.0 that will contain targets to advance localisation. Donors committed to more reforms, signing the Grand Bargain 2.0 agreement in mid-2022. In October 2022, CARE International, Christian Aid, Oxfam, Plan International, and Save the Children International struck an agreement called the Pledge for Change, committing to only operate in humanitarian crises where local capacity was absent, by 2030.

== See also ==
- Agency (sociology)
- Appropriate technology
- Empowerment
- Public participation
- Public participation (decision making)
