= Fatima Jibrell =

Somali environmentalist, conservationist, humanitarian

Fatima Jama Jibrell
- Fadumo Jibriil
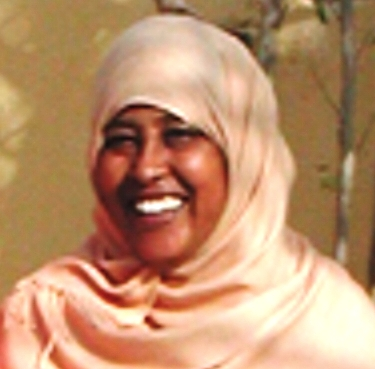
- Born: December 30, 1947 (age 78); Sanaag, Somalia
- Education: University of Connecticut, University of the District of Columbia
- Occupations: Environmental activist, filmmaker
- Children: Five daughters, including Degan Ali
- Awards: Goldman Environmental Prize; National Geographic Society/Buffett Award for Leadership; Champions of the Earth award Takreem award

Fatima Jibrell (Somali: Fadumo Jibriil, Arabic: فاطمة جبريل; born December 30, 1947) is a Somali-American environmental activist. She was the co-founder and executive director of the Horn of Africa Relief and Development Organization (now Adeso), co-founder of Sun Fire Cooking, and was instrumental in the creation of the Women's Coalition for Peace.

== Biography ==
Jibrell was born on December 30, 1947, in Sanaag, Somalia to a nomadic family. Her father was a merchant marine who settled in New York City. As a child in Somalia, she attended a British boarding school until the age of 16, when she left the country to join her father in the United States. There, Jibrell graduated from Temple High School.

In 1969, she returned to Somalia and worked for the government, whereafter she married her husband, Abdurahman Mohamoud Ali, a diplomat. While she and her family were stationed in Iraq, Jibrell began undergraduate studies at the University of Damascus in nearby Syria. In 1981, her husband was transferred to the U.S., where she completed her Bachelor of Arts in English. She eventually went on to pursue a Master's in Social Work from the University of Connecticut. While living in the U.S., Jibrell and her husband raised five daughters, including Degan Ali. She also became an American citizen.

== Environmentalism ==
Spurred on by the civil war in Somalia that began in 1991, Jibrell along with her husband and family friends co-founded the Horn of Africa Relief and Development Organization, colloquially referred to as Horn Relief, a non-governmental organization (NGO) for which she served as the executive director. In 2012, Horn Relief officially changed its name to Adeso. While Jibrell retired as executive director in 2006, she maintains a role on the organization's board of directors and in its Somalia programs. Adeso describes its mission as grassroots level work aimed at uplifting local communities.

Jibrell was instrumental in the creation of the Women's Coalition for Peace to encourage more participation by women in politics and social issues. She also co-founded Sun Fire Cooking, which aims to introduce solar cookers to Somalia so as to reduce the reliance on charcoal as a fuel.

In 2008, Jibrell wrote and co-produced a short film entitled Charcoal Traffic, which employs a fictional storyline to educate the public about the charcoal crisis. The film was directed by the filmmaker Nathan Collett.

In 2011, Jibrell along with retired Australian diplomat James Lindsay also published Peace and Milk: Scenes of Northern Somalia, a photography book on Somalia's nomadic countryside and life. The work has received international accolades from environmental organizations, including the Goldman Environmental Foundation and Résistants pour la Terre.

== Anti-charcoal campaign ==
Through Horn Relief, Jibrell mounted a successful campaign to salvage old-growth forests of acacia trees in the northeastern part of Somalia. These trees, which can grow up to 500 years old, were being cut down to make charcoal since this so-called "black gold" is highly in demand in the Arabian Peninsula, where the region's Bedouin tribes believe the acacia to be sacred.

However, while being a relatively inexpensive fuel that meets a user's needs, the production of charcoal often leads to deforestation and desertification. As a way of addressing this problem, Jibrell and Horn Relief trained a group of adolescents to educate the public on the permanent damage that producing charcoal can create.

In 1999, Horn Relief coordinated a peace march in the northeastern Puntland region of Somalia to put an end to the so-called "charcoal wars." As a result of Jibrell's lobbying and education efforts, the Puntland government in 2000 prohibited the exportation of charcoal. The government has also since enforced the ban, which has reportedly led to an 80% drop in exports of the product.

== Awards ==
For her efforts environmental degradation and desertification, Jibrell has received a number of awards. In 2002, she was presented the Goldman Environmental Prize, the most prestigious grassroots environmental award. In 2008, she also won the National Geographic Society/Buffett Foundation Award for Leadership in Conservation.
