= Roderick Flower =

British pharmacologist

Roderick John Flower is a British pharmacologist, and professor at Barts and The London School of Medicine and Dentistry. Dr. Flower is a member of the board of directors of Antibe Therapeutics and on the scientific advisory board of Morria.

Flower was educated at Woodbridge School, and graduated with a first class degree in Physiology, from the University of Sheffield in 1971. He was Chair of Pharmacology at the University of Bath from 1985 to 1990. He was Wellcome Principal Research Fellow, from 1994 to 2007.

He was President of the British Pharmacological Society from 2000 to 2003, and delivered a lecture to Manchester Literary & Philosophical Society on 25 November 2013 on the topic "Lifestyle Drugs and Human Enhancement" notes of it may be viewed
