= Network for Empowered Aid Response =

Network of local humanitarian organisations

- Formation: 2016
- Purpose: Advance localisation in Humanitarian Aid
- Headquarters: Nairobi, Kenya
- Executive Director: Hibak Kalfan
- Chair: Sema Genel Karaosmanoğlu
- Website: www.near.ngo

The Network for Empowered Aid Response, often called the NEAR Network, is a group of humanitarian civil society organisations based in Africa, Asia, and the Middle East.

The Network increases collaboration between its members and advocates for the a higher percentage of funding to be given to local humanitarian organizations.

== Activities ==
The Network for Empowered Aid Response advocates for not for profit humanitarian organizations in low income countries, increase collaboration between organizations. It runs a funding programme for local humanitarian initiatives, and an online platform called South-to-South that helps share learning between local and national humanitarian organizations.

Following a pledge to improve localisation made at the Word Humanitarian Summit, NEAR Network was launched in 2016 and incubated by Adeso with $50,000 funding from the Conrad N. Hilton Foundation.

In 2017 and 2018, NEAR Network was critical of government donors failure to comply with 2016 commitments made as part of the Grand Bargain to fund local organizations directly.

In 2019, NEAR Network launched the Localisation Performance Measurement Framework to help harmonize systems of reporting to government donors.

== Key people ==
- Executive Director, Hibak Kalfan
- Chair, Sema Genel Karaosmanoğlu
- Alix Masson, Advocacy lead

== See also ==
- Localisation (humanitarian practice)
