= Crisis Preparedness and Response Centre =

Agency established by the Government of Malaysia

Crisis Preparedness and Response Centre (CPRC; Malay: Pusat Kesiapsiagaan dan Tindak Cepat Krisis) is the agency established by the Government of Malaysia under the 9th Malaysian Plan (2005–2010) as part of the overall strategy for effective disaster preparedness, outbreaks, crises and emergencies (Disaster, Outbreak, Crisis, Emergency - DOCE) related to health The opening of the CPRC was conducted by Malaysian Health Minister Datuk Seri Chua Soi Lek on May 7, 2007. The CPRC is located at Level 6, Block E10, Complex E, Federal Government Administrative Center, Putrajaya.

In its early days it served more as a centre of preparedness and response to dealing with the outbreak of infectious diseases and disasters. With the current development, CPRC has expanded its activities to all types and incidents involving public health such as natural disasters, "mass casualty incident", Chemical, Biological, Radiological, Nuclear and Explosives (CBRNe), terrorism and coup attempts.

== Operations ==
=== Flu pandemic ===
The Perak State Emergency Preparedness and Response Centre began operations in April 2009, following the onset of the Influenza A (H1N1) pandemic. The centre is activated in accordance with the intention of the Ministry of Health Malaysia to coordinate health activities related to preparedness, prompt action and recovery before, during and after an outbreak of illness, disaster and crisis. In addition, the centre also works to coordinate actions, collaborate and maintain communication networks within health departments, ministries and other related agencies within or outside Perak. To date, the Motion Room is open daily including Weekly Holidays or General holidays. A total of 147 outbreaks were managed/monitored through the CPRC Perak in 2012.

=== Malaysian floods ===
The Ministry of Health (MOH) has activated the National Crisis Preparedness and Emergency Response Centre (CPRC) in Putrajaya to monitor the flood situation across Malaysia by the end of 2019. The CPRC will provide daily updates to MOH regarding the number of flood victims and those moving to temporary placement center (PPS) to enable immediate and immediate action to be taken. CPRC will work with PPS in flood-affected areas. The PPS has input on the flood victims who can be shared with the District Health Office. Inputs from the PPS will help MOH handle any health issues if any.

=== COVID-19 in Malaysia ===
The Ministry of Health (MOH) has activated the National Crisis Preparedness and Response Centre (CPRC) to monitor current developments on COVID-19 and to prepare for the pandemic.
