= World Humanitarian Summit =

2016 meeting

- Location: Istanbul, Turkey
- Key people: Antoine Gérard, Chief
- Website: agendaforhumanity.org/summit.html

The United Nations World Humanitarian Summit (WHS) was held in Istanbul, Turkey, on May 23 and 24, 2016. The summit was an initiative of the Secretary-General of the United Nations Ban Ki-moon and was organized by the United Nations Office for the Coordination of Humanitarian Affairs (UN OCHA).

Ban Ki-moon, in his five-year action agenda released in January 2012, set out his vision to develop a humanitarian system that was more global, accountable, and robust. A key aspect of his agenda was "convening a World Humanitarian Summit to help share knowledge and establish common best practices among the wide spectrum of organizations involved in humanitarian action.'

The summit’s goal was to fundamentally reform the humanitarian aid industry to react in a more effective manner to the crises of today. World leaders were expected to come to the summit and announce the actions they will take to end the suffering of millions of women, men and children affected by armed conflicts and disasters.

The summit convened 9000 participants from 173 countries, including 55 heads of state and government, hundreds of private sector representatives, and thousands of people from civil society and nongovernmental organizations.

== Background ==
First announced in January 2012, the World Humanitarian Summit built on several years of preparation, including consultations with more than 23,000 people in 153 countries. Notable documents include a synthesis report summarizing the findings of the consultations and a report by U.N. Secretary-General Ban Ki-moon titled ‘One Humanity, Shared Responsibility.’

=== Regional and Thematic Consultations ===
Eight regional consultations were held between 2014 and 2015 to determine the agenda for the summit and the key issues to be discussed. Online submissions were also accepted between May 2014 and July 2015. The results of the consultation process were presented in a synthesis report at the Global Consultation in Geneva, Switzerland, on October 14–16, 2015.

=== United Nations Secretary-General’s Report: ‘One Humanity, Shared Responsibility’ ===
On February 9, 2016, Secretary-General Ban Ki-moon released a report building on the findings of the consultation process.

In the report, the Secretary-General noted five core responsibilities to improve humanitarian action:

1. Prevent and end conflict
2. Uphold the norms that safeguard humanity
3. Leave no one behind
4. Working differently to end need
5. Invest in humanity

As an annex to the report, the Secretary-General put forward an agenda for humanity, which described his vision for the future of humanitarian action and outlined what was needed to deliver on the five responsibilities.

=== Organizational arrangements ===
In 2013 a secretariat was established to manage the consultation process and the organization of the summit. The secretariat was funded and supported by a wide range of donors including the European Commission for Humanitarian Aid and Civil Protection.

In April 2014, Dr. Jemilah Mahmood of Malaysia was appointed as the chief of the secretariat. After the summit's global consultation, Mahmood left the secretariat to take up a new role. In November 2015, Antoine Gérard was announced as the new head of the secretariat.

On March 7, 2016, there was a reorganization of the summit management team by OCHA. Stephen O'Brien, the Under-Secretary-General for Humanitarian Affairs and emergency relief coordinator, and Kyung-wha Kang, the Assistant Secretary-General and deputy emergency relief coordinator took responsibility for strategic oversight of the summit preparations. Gwi-Yeop Son, Director of OCHA Corporate Programmes, was placed in charge of all aspects of the summit logistics, including liaisons with the Government of Turkey. John Ging, Director of OCHA Operations, was assigned responsibility of delivering the Grand Bargain. Herve Verhoosel, an experienced communications expert, was recruited as Spokesperson for the Summit in March 2016.

In March and April 2016 OCHA reassigned over 140 of their staff from existing emergency operations such as South Sudan and headquarter functions, to support the Summit preparations.

== Summit proceedings ==
"The summit is a point of departure in getting those in the aid community to work differently, to improve the way we deliver assistance," said summit head Antoine Gérard.

The World Humanitarian Summit programme included 7 roundtables, 14 special sessions, 132 side events and an announcement plenary. At the Summit, governments, humanitarian organizations, business, and other stakeholders announced more than 1,500 commitments on how they want to improve humanitarian action.

The summit proceedings were made available online and a report its outcomes and a list of all commitments was released after the event.

== Outcomes ==
According to UN Secretary-General Ban Ki-moon, the summit resulted in about 1,500 commitments from 400 UN member states and other organizations.

On a political level, the summit received mixed reviews. Critics of the summit argued that the lack of a binding agreement made it "toothless," although supporters say that as a non-intergovernmental process that was never its purpose. However, separate to the actual summit proceedings, 61 countries including the United States, Canada and other major donors endorsed a political communiqué, committing to support the "five core responsibilities" of the Secretary-General's "Agenda for Humanity."

The summit was attended by an impressive 173 member states, including 55 heads of state or government, many from countries affected by humanitarian crises. Secretary-General Ban Ki-moon expressed disappointment that the world's most powerful leaders did not attend, notably those from the G7 countries except for German Chancellor Angela Merkel. However, at the closing press conference, Ban Ki-moon said "The absence of these leaders from World Humanitarian Summit does not provide an excuse for inaction."

One of the summit's main achievements was the Grand Bargain, which is the name for a set of 51 "commitments" to reform humanitarian financing to make emergency aid finance more efficient and effective. According to IRIN reporting, "to some it hasn’t gone nearly far enough. Others say, given a few short months, the bureaucracies did well to find so much to agree on."

Another major achievement was in the area of disaster preparedness. A new "Global Partnership for Preparedness" was launched to help countries get ready for future disasters. The initiative is a collaboration between the V20 (a group of ministers of Finance of the Climate Vulnerable Forum which represents 43 high risk developing nations), the UN and the World Bank. The partnership will help 20 most at-risk countries attain a basic level of readiness by 2020 for future disaster risks, mainly caused by climate change.

The summit process also resulted in the "Education Cannot Wait" fund, the first global fund to prioritise education in humanitarian action. Several countries pledged financial contributions to the fund, including the UK, which committed £30 million.

Another important outcome of the summit was the Charter on Inclusion of Persons with Disabilities in Humanitarian Action. The charter was hailed as "a victory for disabled people who have been largely ignored in humanitarian aid operations".

The summit generated many other commitments and initiatives. The Secretary-General and eight UN agencies signed a "commitment" to work in new ways across their humanitarian and development efforts in order to meet and reduce human suffering. Leaders also launched the first-ever global compact on including young people in humanitarian action.

World Humanitarian Forum (WHF) was also formed after the Summit, as an independent organisation, focused on measuring the impact of the outcomes and continue the dialogue.

== Criticism ==
On 5 May Médecins Sans Frontières withdrew from the summit: "With regret, we have come to the decision to pull out of the summit. We no longer have any hope that the WHS will address the weaknesses in humanitarian action and emergency response, particularly in conflict areas or epidemic situations. Instead, the WHS’s focus would seem to be an incorporation of humanitarian assistance into a broader development and resilience agenda. Further, the summit neglects to reinforce the obligations of states to uphold and implement the humanitarian and refugee laws which they have signed up to".

Policy analyst Rahul Chandran has criticized the summit for lacking focus and specific proposals. Oxfam International and Save the Children, along with a number of other agencies, also expressed concern that adapting humanitarian action to the differing needs of gender, age, and disability was not given high enough priority.

There was also an online campaign to include issues around aid worker health and safety. This campaign was started by Brendan McDonald, a UN aid worker, in a July 2015 article in The Guardian, "Humanitarian agencies need to stop failing their staff on mental health", which called upon aid workers to support a petition to have the issue tabled at the summit. The justification for the campaign was amplified in Guardian research that suggested a mental health crisis among aid workers. On 10 December 2015, the United Nations General Assembly also referred to this issue, noting "the importance of giving due consideration to the question of the safety and security of United Nations and other humanitarian personnel at the World Humanitarian Summit." Rebecca Maudling, company director at ILS, wrote: 'of the 112 side events (at the summit), there is one co-hosted by RedR UK on strategies to end attacks specifically on health workers and one co-hosted by Humanitarian Outcomes on improving access and assistance which is likely to touch on the issues. However, despite targeting of aid workers and repeated violations of international humanitarian law which directly affects their safety, wellbeing, and ultimately their ability to deliver humanitarian assistance, this issue does not appear to have gained any prominence."

Summit preparations also led to wider controversy over the structure and distribution of power within the humanitarian system. At ALNAP’s Global Forum in June 2015, humanitarian organizations called on the United Nations to reform its mandates and streamline UN agencies to better meet the humanitarian needs of people globally. Some have said that discussion of UN reform was resisted by senior UN leadership during the regional consultations process, and the UN's aid chief Stephen O'Brien stating in an interview that the UN doesn't need to fundamentally change, but to "build on the best" and bring in additional innovation and skills.

At the Global Consultation meeting in Geneva, Kenya-based Adeso and other humanitarian organizations called for a shift of power and funding from international organizations to those working on the ground. Currently, local organizations receive two percent of direct humanitarian funding with the rest going to organizations based in Europe and the United States. To continue advocating for this shift, the first ever Global Network of Southern non-governmental organizations is scheduled to be launched in May 2016 during the summit.

Some in the aid community described the process as "endless", "top down", and a "smokescreen" doing little to deliver humanitarian aid more efficiently. A 2019 annual progress report by the Overseas Development Institute think tank found some progress but also pointed to fuzzy goals, unwieldy management, and slow-going in certain areas.

== See also ==
- UN Office for the Coordination of Humanitarian Affairs
- Grand Bargain
- Humanitarian-Development Nexus
- Network for Empowered Aid Response
- Localisation (humanitarian practice)
