= Daniel K. Podolsky =

American gastroenterologist

Daniel Kalman Podolsky (born c. 1953) is an American gastroenterologist and member of the National Academy of Medicine. He serves as President of the University of Texas Southwestern Medical Center. and co-chairman of Southwestern Health Resources, a collaboration between UT Southwestern and Texas Health Resources that cares for patients across North Texas and includes more than 30 hospitals, 300 clinics, and 2,600 physicians.

== Early life and education ==
Podolsky was born in Detroit, Michigan, the third of five children of Harold and Ruth Podolsky, first-generation Americans whose parents emigrated from Russia in the early 1900s. His father was a physician who practiced general medicine, performed surgery, and delivered babies.

Podolsky graduated summa cum laude from Harvard College in 1974, receiving the L.J. Henderson Prize for the top thesis in biochemistry by elucidating the role of glycosyltransferases in epithelial differentiation.

In 1978, he graduated magna cum laude from Harvard Medical School and received the Leon Reznick Memorial Prize for outstanding research, followed by residency training in internal medicine and a fellowship in gastroenterology at Massachusetts General Hospital.

== Career ==
In 1982, Podolsky joined the academic faculty at Massachusetts General Hospital, Harvard Medical School. He was named Chief of Gastroenterology at Massachusetts General Hospital in 1989.

In 1991, Podolsky established the Center for the Study of Inflammatory Bowel Disease, which was funded through the National Institute of Diabetes and Digestive and Kidney Diseases (NIDDK) Digestive Disease Center program. He also established the High-Risk GI Cancer Center, the Liver-Biliary-Pancreas Center, and a liver motility center. He was named the Mallinckrodt Professor of Medicine at Harvard Medical School in 1998.

From 2005 to 2008, Podolsky served as Chief Academic Officer of Partners HealthCare, which was co-founded by Massachusetts General Hospital and Brigham and Women’s Hospital in 1994. As Chief Academic Officer, he led a $1 billion research enterprise as well as graduate medical education at both hospitals. Podolsky also served as Faculty Dean for Academic Programs at Partners and Harvard Medical School.

In 2008, Podolsky became the third President of the University of Texas Southwestern Medical Center, where he is a professor of Internal Medicine and holds the Philip O’Bryan Montgomery, Jr., M.D. Distinguished Presidential Chair in Academic Administration and the Doris and Bryan Wildenthal Distinguished Chair in Medical Science.

He is currently a member of the Association of American Physicians, the American Society for Clinical Investigation, and the American Federation for Medical Research (formerly the American Federation for Clinical Research). He also serves on the Board of Directors of Agilent Technologies.

Podolsky previously served as vice president for Research of the Foundation for Digestive Health and Nutrition, a member of the Advisory Council of the NIDDK, a member-at-large of the National Scientific Advisory Committee of the Crohn’s & Colitis Foundation, and on the Board of Directors of GlaxoSmithKline.

During his career, Podolsky has trained more than 80 GI fellows on faculties worldwide along with 120 postdoctoral fellows.

== Research ==
A gastroenterologist and translational researcher, Podolsky investigates the delineation of epithelial cell function. His laboratory has identified and characterized the functional actions and molecular mechanisms of trefoil peptides, which are central to sustaining mucosal integrity and facilitating repair after injury has occurred.

Observations about trefoil proteins made by the Podolsky laboratory have served as a stimulus for the study of the trefoil factor family by research groups worldwide. The therapeutic implications on trefoil peptides extend to nonsteroidal anti-inflammatory drug-induced gastropathy, chemotherapy-induced mucositis, alcohol-induced gastropathy, peptic ulcer, infectious diarrhea, and inflammatory bowel disease.

In conjunction with studies defining basic mechanisms regulating epithelial function, Podolsky’s laboratory has provided insights into the role of these processes in intestinal inflammatory diseases. He has been the principal investigator on numerous federal research grants and is the author of more than 300 original research and review articles.

Podolsky is an author of several textbooks, including Inflammatory Bowel Diseases: A Clinician’s Guide, which was highly commended by the British Medical Association 2018 Medical Book Awards.

== Honors and awards ==
- 2009 – Elected to the National Academy of Medicine (formerly the Institute of Medicine of the National Academy of Science)
- 2009 – American Gastroenterological Association Julius Freidenwald Medal
- 2007 – American Gastroenterological Association Distinguished Achievement Award
- 2003 – President, American Gastroenterological Association
- 1998 – National Institutes of Health’s MERIT Award
