= Common Operational Datasets =

Common Operational Datasets or CODs, are authoritative reference datasets needed to support operations and decision-making for all actors in a humanitarian response. CODs are 'best available' datasets that ensure consistency and simplify the discovery and exchange of key data. The data is typically geo-spatially linked using a coordinate system (especially administrative boundaries) and has unique geographic identification codes (P-codes).

== Governance and Purpose of CODs ==
=== Purpose ===
Common operation datasets are commonly used and referenced by all operations, they provide consistency among all actors working on humanitarian preparedness and response and enable a common operational picture (COP) of the crisis. P-codes facilitate the exchange and harmonization of data and information, they provide a geographic framework for data collection, analysis, and visualization (see P-code) and allow for a better interoperability and exchange between different actors. Therefore, Common operation datasets (CODs) reduce duplication of work on baseline data by partnering organizations and facilitate informed decision making both pre- and post-crisis.

=== The Information Management Network ===
The Information Management Network (IM Network) is an important component of the common operational datatset (COD) process. The IM Network can exist at country, regional and global levels and is composed of the humanitarian information management actors active in the country, region or at the global level. Potential IM Network actors include governments, United NAtions agencies and programmes, humanitarian cluster information management staff, international and national NGOs.

== Common Operational Datasets ==
=== Core Common Operational Datasets ===
Core CODs are required in all disaster-prone countries as a preparedness measure, including administrative boundaries (COD-AB), sex and age-disaggregated population data (COD-PS), and humanitarian profile (caseload or COD-HP). They are critical for information and data products and to underpin effective coordination. Core CODs enable effective risk analysis, needs assessment, decision-making, and reporting on all aspects of the response.

==== Administrative Boundaries (COD-AB) ====
Administrative Boundary CODs are baseline geographical datasets that are used by humanitarian agencies during preparedness and response activities. They are preferably sourced from official government boundaries but when these are unavailable the information management network must develop and agree to a process to develop or adopt an alternate dataset. Administrative boundaries provide an essential data standard and are used directly and indirectly in almost every information product.

The administrative boundary dataset is key in preparedness and undergoes a review process to keep the data up to date.

==== Population Statistics (COD-PS) ====
Population Statistics CODs are the baseline population figures of a country pre-crisis situation. They are preferably developed by a government during a census but can also be derived from estimated figures. When neither of these options are available the information management network must develop and agree to a process to develop a dataset that can be used by humanitarian agencies during preparedness and response activities.

Population statistics are required to inform programming in humanitarian response. Specifically, they are used to estimate the potential number of affected people or as a reference/resource in the development of needs assessments and in analysis.

==== Humanitarian Profile (COD-HP) ====
Humanitarian profile (affected people, people in need)

=== Country-specific CODs ===
Country-specific Common Operational Datasets are a subset of the CODs that are specific to each country’s risk profile. They are datasets for which it is essential that the humanitarian community uses the same version of the data as a reference. The purpose of a country-specific COD is to provide a common reference for the humanitarian community to create a common operational picture (spatial datasets); to allow for further understanding of the situation (statistical data, tabular data etc); or to aid with assessments. Ideally, Country-specific CODs are identified and agreed to as a preparedness activity but the list should be reviewed and revised (if required) at the onset of a crisis based on the situation at that time and the humanitarian needs).

==== Examples of Common Operational Datasets by disaster type ====
===== Conflict =====
- Active conflict zones
- Areas unsafe to access (mine contamination/ERWs)
- Road blocks / check points

===== Drought =====
- Livestock conditions
- Water points or sources
- Normalized difference vegetation index (NDVI)

===== Earthquake =====
- Land use/cover (geology)
- Hypsography (elevation model)
- Dams

===== Typhoon/Hurricane/Cyclone =====
- Storm path
- Precipitation forecast
- Evacuation centers

===== Floods =====
- Waste collection / water treatment sites
- Hydrology
- Disease profile

===== Other =====
- Settlements (often as a point dataset)
- key infrastructure (e.g. road, rail, port, power and telephone infrastructure)
- Natural hazards (e.g. flood risk, volcanoes, seismic risk)
- Assessed disaster impacts and/or needs (e.g. infrastructure and communications damage, affected populations statistics, affected land area)
- Satellite imagery

== Process ==
The life cycle of a Common Operational Dataset (COD) is planning, collecting, processing, endorsing, communicating, maintaining.

Common Operational Datasets (CODs) are identified by the information management network (IM network) in a country or regionally. If there is no IM network in place all efforts are made at higher levels (e.g. global) to identify desired datasets. The IM network is responsible for collecting and maintaining the CODs and revising the datasets as required. CODs are made available online, if possible, prior to an emergency or shortly after disaster strikes.

=== Planning ===
IM Network partners work together to develop a plan for all CODs including prioritization of datasets. The goal of the planning phase is to have an agreed upon list of commonly used datasets by partners. Once clear goals and objectives are identified, work can begin on the identification of sources and datasets.

=== Collecting ===
Collecting CODs is the process of locally acquiring datasets, and includes collection of metadata. The second part of the collection process is the evaluation phase that includes an examination of potential sources. The evaluation involves a quick in-country quality assurance check to ensure (potential) compliance with the minimum standard of data characteristics (spatial and attribute) and metadata. The process identifies potential problems or opportunities with datasets that should be considered when deciding what dataset should become the COD.

=== Processing ===
In the process phase the quality of the dataset is improved to the best standard possible. The processing phase cleans and standardizes the datasets and can be the most resource and time intensive stage of the COD cycle if the quality of the data is low.

=== Endorsement ===
The endorsement phase has 2 steps: validation and endorsement (in the country and at the global level).

The validation phase is a technical review on the Candidate COD and is done to ensure that the corrections made in the processing phase have created the best available COD.

The endorsement phase of CODs is the defining moment of the COD cycle as it is at this stage that operational partners agree that the candidate COD is going to be the referential dataset for humanitarian preparedness and response activities.

=== Communication ===
The Communication phase includes agreed upon means of sharing the dataset and also transparency about changes of the data in the process, available metadata and advocation for the use of common operational datatsets.

=== Maintenance ===
Maintenance is an important step in the COD cycle as it ensures that the datasets are still relevant and accurate for humanitarian use. This is done at least once a year or in the timespan agreed upon.

== P-codes ==
Place Codes (P-Codes) are found in Administrative Boundary CODs. They are unique geographic (geo) identification codes, represented by combinations of letters and/or numbers to identify a specific location or feature on a map or within a database. For a specific place, point, or positional locations, the geo-codes have come into common usages as P-codes (abbreviated for Place-code). These terms can be essentially interchanged as long as one recognizes the focus on “position or place” for P-codes. They are also used to provide unique reference codes to refer to settlements or administrative boundaries in other datasets.

== Notes ==
Whilst some data-sets remain relatively constant (e.g. geographical features and administrative boundaries) others change (assessed disaster impacts and needs) and require to be regularly updated.

CODs are intended to be used universally to improve coordination in humanitarian action; to build a common operational picture enabling more consistent activity and reduce duplication of data collection. The main source of curated CODs is the Humanitarian Data Exchange, though CODs may also be found on various governmental and independent websites.
