= Gaseous mediator =

Gaseous mediators are chemicals that are produced in small amounts by some cells of the mammalian body and have a number of biological signalling functions. There are three so-far-identified gaseous mediator molecules: nitric oxide (NO), hydrogen sulfide (H_{2}S), and carbon monoxide (CO).

== Clinical applications ==
Endogenous gaseous mediators have shown anti-inflammatory and cytoprotective properties Combination nonsteroidal anti-inflammatory drugs featuring both a cyclooxygenase inhibitor and gaseous mediator releasing component are being investigated as a safer alternative to current anti-inflammatory drugs due to their potential reduction in risk for gastrointestinal ulcer formation.

== Role of gaseous mediators during septic shock ==
When septic shock occurs in the human body due to bacterial toxins, nitric oxide is released by a variety of cells through the expression of inducible nitric oxide synthase in order to induce vasodilation as part of the inflammatory response. The released nitric oxide can be crucial to the body by reducing instances of platelet and leukocyte adhesion while also counteracting apoptosis. However, prolonged septic shock could lead to the overproduction of nitric oxide, which could lead to cell damage due to nitric oxide radical formation and peroxynitrite (ONOO^{−}) formation after interacting with oxygen in the body. In order to alleviate the toxic effects caused by overproduction of nitric oxide during septic shock, a single high dose (5g IV) of Vitamin B12 has shown the potential to inhibit nitric oxide synthase while acting as a radical scavenger that assists in the elimination of excess nitric oxide produced during prolonged septic shock.
