= The New Humanitarian =

News agency based in Kenya

- Type: News agency
- Founded: Nairobi (1995)
- Headquarters: Geneva, Switzerland
- Key people: Tammam Aloudat (CEO); Andrew Gully (Managing Editor)
- Website: www.thenewhumanitarian.org

The New Humanitarian, previously known as IRIN News, or Integrated Regional Information Networks News, is an independent, non-profit news agency. The agency states that it intends to report on stories from regions that it considers overlooked or under-reported.

Originally a project of the United Nations Office for the Coordination of Humanitarian Affairs (OCHA), IRIN News operated under the UN from 1995 until 1 January 2015. On 21 March 2019, IRIN relaunched independently as The New Humanitarian. The primary language is English, with a smaller number of articles available in French and Arabic.

== History ==
=== Early years as IRIN ===
IRIN was launched in 1995 after the Great Lakes refugee crisis resulting from the 1994 Rwandan genocide with the aim of providing reliable reports on humanitarian crises and responses. IRIN was set up with headquarters in Nairobi, Kenya, and regional news desks in Nairobi, Johannesburg, Dakar, Dubai, and Bangkok, with liaison offices in New York and Geneva. The agency was managed by the Office for the Coordination of Humanitarian Affairs.

=== PlusNews ===
In 2001, IRIN created PlusNews, a news service dedicated exclusively to the HIV/AIDS epidemic. The service gradually expanded to include French, Portuguese, and Arabic. It became one of the largest providers of original HIV and AIDS reporting. One of its documentary series, "Heroes of HIV", earned an honorable mention at the 14th annual Webby Awards.

In 2005, an IRIN video documentary "Our bodies... their battleground" that focused on sexual violence against women in Congo and Liberia won "Best Feature" at the UN Documentary Film Festival.

=== The New Humanitarian ===
On 1 January 2015, IRIN became an independent non-profit news organization. On 21 March 2019, it rebranded to The New Humanitarian.

In 2020, in partnership with the Thomson Reuters Foundation, The New Humanitarian investigated the widespread abuse of women who worked for humanitarian agencies in the Democratic Republic of the Congo while responding to the Kivu Ebola outbreak.

== Audience ==
A 2018 survey of their readers found that they are composed of: Not-for-profit and NGO (35.9%), Academia (8.6%), United Nations (8.5%), Government (8.1%), Media (7.6%), Business (5.4%), Donor (1.2%), Other (24.7%).

More than 40 percent of its audience originates from Africa, Asia, the Middle East, and Latin America.

The New Humanitarian regularly hosts in-person and live-streamed discussions on issues in the humanitarian sector.

The outlet also produces several podcasts, like the flagship Rethinking Humanitarianism and What's Unsaid.

== Newsletters ==
When The New Humanitarian was established as IRIN in 1995, it used fax and email to distribute weekly roundups on the Great Lakes region from its headquarters in Nairobi, Kenya. Its first website was launched In the late 1990s.

Today, in addition to its website, The New Humanitarian continues to provide daily and weekly newsletters to more than 70,000 subscribers.

== Donors ==
The New Humanitarian's funding comes from a mix of governments, foundations, and a small number of private donors as well as a membership programme.

Key supporters have included the Bill & Melinda Gates Foundation, the Canton of Geneva, and the international aid agencies of Australia, Belgium, Canada, Norway, Sweden, and Switzerland.
