= Tawfiiq =

Town in Mudug,Bari,Snaag,NugaalPuntland

Tawfiiq Towfiiq توفيق
- Town / Districts, Godobjiraan,Iskushuban,Gargoore,Hafuun,Baargaal,Caluula,Hufayn,Xaabo,Murcanyo,Qandala,Baran,Hadaaftimo,Caalmadow,Cayrigaabo.
- Motto: The heart of Golol
- Location in Somalia.
- Coordinates: 6°37′02″N 48°52′31″E
- Country: Somalia: Puntland
- Province: Mudug
- District: Tawfiiq
- Time zone: UTC+3 (EAT)

Tawfiiq (Somali: Tawfiiq, Arabic: توفيق), also known as Towfiiq, is a town in the north-central Mudug region of Puntland. It lies beyond the Golol valley, 160 km northeast of the provincial capital of Tawfiiq District.

== History ==
The settlement was founded relatively recently, in the year 2000. Due to its grazing areas and natural lakes, it has evolved into a gathering point for livestock herders. In early 2011 Tawfiiq Primary and Intermediate school was also established in the town. Towfiq belongs to Saleban Abdalle who are sub-clan of Surre tribe.

== Demographics ==
Tawfiiq is primarily inhabited by people from the Somali ethnic group, with the loobage sub-clan of the sheekhaal and the Saleban Abdalle sub-clan of Surre of the Dir especially well-represented.

== Administration ==
Tawfiiq is governed by the autonomous Puntland administration. And many villages including El Danane, Buq Qalloo, Galhagoog, Dhinowda and Hingaras are under Tawfiiq's jurisdiction. Due to its rapid growth, the town was declared a full district by the Puntland ministerial cabinet in April 2013.

== Notable residents ==
- Sayidomar Aden Guled - Puntland State minister of Health
- Mahad Abdalle Awad – Second Deputy Speaker of the Federal Parliament of Somalia.
