= Mindigale =

Mindigale Degmada Mindigale
- Town
- Location
- Coordinates: 10°40′49″N 48°40′27″E
- Country: Somaliland
- Region: Sanaag
- District: Las Khorey

Population (2016)
  - Total: 700
- Time zone: UTC+3 (East Africa Time)

Mindigale (Somali: Midigale) is a town in the Sanaag region of Somaliland.

== Overview ==
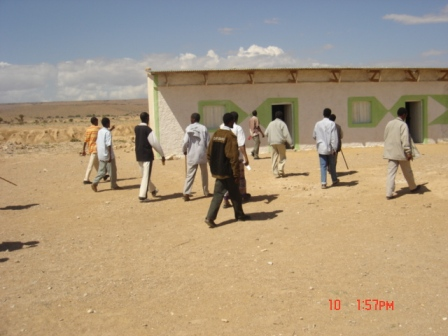
Primary school in Mindigale, Somaliland

Since the city was growing considerably after civil war, as the native people were coming back from the capital, the education sector was also experiencing significant development, the first primary school was built in 1990s

== Recent History ==
Relation Map. M=Mindigale, Ba= Badhan, G=Garoowe, Ed=El Dahir, Eg=Erigavo, Bo=Bosaso, Bu=Buraan

Around 2000, Horn Relief built a rock dam (temporary dam made of piled up small rocks) in Mindigale and other areas to improve irrigation channels, and education on the technology.

In July 2017, the El Dahir road construction committee met with Puntland President Abdiweli Gaas in Garowe to report that road construction between El Dahir and Erigavo is currently underway near Mindigale.

In September 2018, Puntland President Abdiweli Gaas and Puntland House of Representatives Speaker visited Mindigale and other villages.

In December 2019, new Puntland Parliament Speaker Cabdirashiid Yuusuf Jibriil was fired upon by opponents of the removal of former Speaker Cabdixakiin Dhooba in Mindigale on his way to Badhan. Although the new chairman was welcomed in Bahan, protests were held nearside Mindigale.

In September 2020, a delegation led by the manager of the Puntland Water Development Agency and consisting of members from South West State of Somalia, Galmudug and Somalia federal government visited Mindigale.

In March 2021, a member of the Puntland Parliament who was traveling to Badhan by car was killed in a traffic accident near Mindigale.

In May 2024, overbuilding of wells in Mindigale caused the wells to run dry, resulting in significant agricultural damage. The Puntland Water Development Agency announced plans to increase the water supply.

== Mayor ==
- Cawad Cali Jaamac - 2017

== See also ==
- Badhan
- Hingalol
