= Bali Busle =

Bali Busle is a town in the Eastern Sanaag region of Puntland (Somalia).

Bali-Busle is a town founded by pastoralists and first settled in the early 1990s.

There is also a town of the same name in the Mudug region.

== Overview ==
During the time of British Somaliland, there were only four settlements in this area: Buraan, El Dahir, Xubeera, and Hadaftimo. After Somalia's independence, new settlements were created through drilling and other activities. Especially when the Somali civil war started in around 1991, many settlements were established. The settlement of Bali busle began in 1992, and the second phase of construction was carried out in 1995. According to an elder in Bali busle. the primary purpose of the settlement was to make charcoal for urban.

The trees used for charcoal production were mainly native acacias, and many of them were cut down. For this reason, the Puntland government banned the export of charcoal from Bosaso port in 1998 and later from other ports. As a result, between 1992 and 2000, the amount of charcoal shipped from Bali busle was as much as 100 truckloads per day, but after 2000, the number dropped to 10 truckloads per day. Pasture grass was also shipped in truckloads of 30-40 by 2000.

The estimated population as of 1999 was 8,000, considerably more than the current population. The Somali Red Crescent Society established hospitals in four locations, including Bali busle, because the spread of diseases was recognized in the area from that time.

In April 2008, diarrhea struck the area, killing 11 people and sickening more than 750 in four surrounding villages, including Bali busle. A doctor at the local hospital said that the Somaliland government and the NGO Horn Relief sent relief supplies.

In November 2017, many malnourished children in Bali busle have been reported, and the Puntland Ministry of Health has been requested to assist with medical supplies.

In May 2019, 100 (or 800) soldiers of the 93rd Battalion of the Somaliland Army, which had been ordered to attack the Badhan region, defected to Puntland in Bali busle.
