= Buh =

Buh may refer to

- Novyi Buh, a city in Ukraine
- Southern Bug, a river in Ukraine
  - Buh Cossacks
- Buh Township, Morrison County, Minnesota, United States
- Buh, Kapurthala, a village in India
- Buh Gujran, a village in India
- El Buh, a town in Somalia
- El Buh District in Somalia
- Saad Buh, a Sufi from Mauritania
- Joseph Buh (1833–1922), Slovenian-American Catholic priest

== See also ==
- BUH (disambiguation)
