= Buraan =

- Town
- Location.
- Coordinates: 10°13′7″N 48°46′7″E
- Country: Somaliland
- State: Sanaag
- Region: Sanaag

Population (2007)
  - Total: 3,300
- Time zone: UTC+3 (EAT)

Buraan, also known as Hiil Buraan or Hiil Borraan, is a town in the eastern Sanaag region of Puntland. It is effectively controlled by Puntland .

== Overview ==
Buraan is situated in eastern Sanaag, near the Las Khorey and Hadaftimo, it is considered to be one of the oldest settlements in the province.

During the British colonial period, four settlements, Buraan in the Sool Plateau and Ceel-Doofaar, Xubeera, and Hadaftimo in the Gebi Valley, were identified in this area.

== Transportation ==
In 2012, the Puntland Highway Authority (PHA) announced a project to connect Buraan and other remote or littoral towns in Puntland to the main regional highway. The 750 km thoroughfare links major cities in the northern part of Somalia, such as Bosaso, Galkayo and Garowe, with towns in the south. It is part of a broader initiative by the Puntland government to develop and renovate the regional transportation infrastructure.

== Recent History ==
Buraan was briefly in the late 2000s a part of the Maakhir administration, which mainly covered Badhan District areas, until it was officially incorporated into the Puntland authority since late 2009.

In May 2012, Deputy Minister of Education Puntland visits Buraan and other educational institutions.

In March 2014, the Gaashaanbuur community in Warsangali met in Buraan to join Somaliland, to sever ties with Puntland, and to close the Puntland offices in Buraan, El Ayo, Bali busle, and Cawsane.

In June 2014, the Puntland government launched a new tree-planting campaign in the state, with the regional Ministry of Environment, Wildlife and Tourism slated to plant 25,000 trees by the end of the year. Buraan is among the seven cities and towns earmarked for the reforestation initiative, which also include Garowe, Bosaso, Qardho, Buuhoodle, Dhahar and Galkayo. The campaign is part of a broader partnership between the Puntland authorities and EU to set up various environmental protection measures in the region, with the aim of promoting reforestation and afforestation.

In July 2014, the Somaliland army invaded Buraan. In response, the residents of Buraan are protesting.

In November 2015, businesses and schools went on holiday to pray for rain.

In April 2016, the Somaliland Sun, a media of Somaliland, reported that most of the Warsangali militia had changed their affiliation from Puntland to Somaliland and gathered in the town of Buraan.

In June 2017, it was reported that construction of a public hospital had begun in Buraan.

In October 2019, a truck carrying Ethiopian migrants from Ethiopia to the northern Somali coastal town of Bosaso was attacked by an armed group near Buraan district, killing the Somali driver and injuring passengers.

In April 2020, police in Buraan seized illegal carts following Puntland's ban on the import of carts from Ethiopia.

In April 2020, a civilian was killed by militia between the villages of Mindigale and Cawsane, and the militia fled towards Buraan. In January 2021, Somaliland attempted to promote voting in the Sanaag region in the national elections, but Puntland government officials commented that they would definitely prevent it as Buraan, along with Dhahar, Hingalol, El Ayo is Puntland territory. In June, Puntland officials announced that no voter registration and elections were held by Somaliland in Las Khorey, Badhan, Hingalol, Dhahar, and Buraan districts of Sanaag region.

In May 2023, the Puntland Election Commission announced the provisional results of the local council elections, with the Mideeye Party coming in first in Buraan with 43% of the vote.

== See also ==
- Administrative divisions of Somaliland
- Regions of Somaliland
- Districts of Somaliland
- Somalia–Somaliland border
