= Enayati =

Enayati (Persian: عنايتي) may refer to:

- Enayati-ye Bala
- Enayati-ye Pain
- Enayati-ye Vasat
