= Nahr-e Gabin =

Nahr-e Gabin (Persian: نهرگبين) may refer to:

- Nahr-e Gabin-e Olya
- Nahr-e Gabin-e Sofla
