= Nahr-e Vasleh =

Nahr-e Vasleh نهروصله
- Village
- Location within Iran
- Coordinates: 30°36′24″N 48°42′30″E
- Country: Iran
- Province: Khuzestan
- County: Shadegan
- Bakhsh: Central
- Rural District: Abshar

Population (2006)
  - Total: 908
- Time zone: UTC+3:30 (IRST)
  - Summer (DST): UTC+4:30 (IRDT)

Nahr-e Vasleh (Persian: نهروصله, also Romanized as Nahr-e Vaṣleh) is a village in Abshar Rural District, in the Central District of Shadegan County, Khuzestan Province, Iran. At the 2006 census, its population was 908, in 174 families.

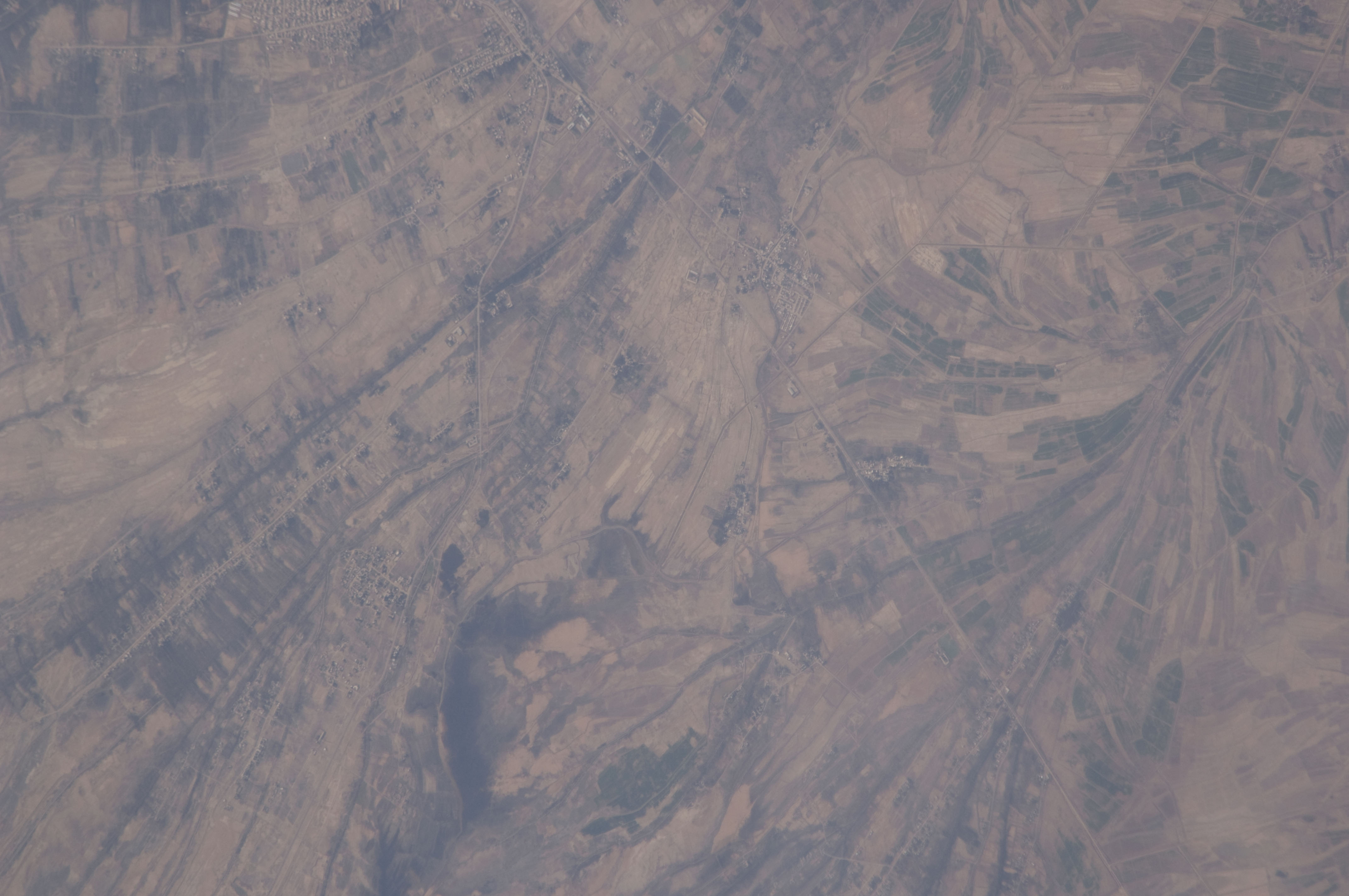
Nahr-e Vasleh agricultural and wetland landscape, nearby Nahr-e Rahmeh and village or town Buzi-ye Seyf
