= Habarshiro =

- Town
- Location within Somaliland
- Coordinates: 10.2402°N 48.4984°E
- Country: Somaliland(territorial claim)
- Region: Sanaag
- District: Badhan

Population (2019)
  - Total: 1,113
- Time zone: UTC+3 (EAT)

Habarshiro (Somali: Xabar Shiiro) is one of the largest towns in the eastern Sanaag region of Somaliland.

== Overview ==
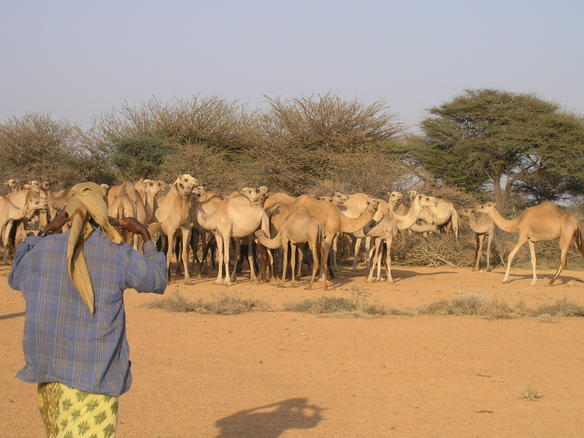
Camel grazing in Habalsilo

It is a relatively new settlement in comparison to other cities in the province. Its nearest neighbor is the city of El Buh, around 50 kilometers away.

In 2013, the number of households was 150. At that time, drought and flooding were reported to have washed away fertile soils and hindered cattle ranching.

According to a 2016 survey, Habarshiro has a well that provides water for water shortages in Midigale, Rad & Laako, Xarkadhere, Mindhicir, etc. The population in 2016 was 280.

== Recent History ==
In November 2005, the entire Sanaag area experienced a water shortage, and the residents of Habarshiro are said to have migrated to the neighborhood.

In September 2016, a meeting of the Bahwadaag Reer Saalax branch of the Warsangali clan was held in Habarshiro. At that meeting, in addition to the unity of the Reer Saalax branch, it was resolved not to send a representative to the meeting scheduled in Burao, Somaliland.

In November 2016, the government of Puntland dispatched water trucks to various locations due to a drought over a large area of Puntland. They were also dispatched to Habarshiro.

In May 2018, Habarshiro was hit by flash floods due to Cyclone Sagar.

In August 2018, the Ministry of Water Development of Puntland began repairing wells in the Sanaag region. It also includes the Habarshiro well.
