= Yubeh =

Yubeh may refer to:

- Yubeh, Iran, a village in Khuzestan Province
- Yubbe, Somalia
