= Qubeys =

Member of the Surre

Qubeys قبيس
Regions with significant populations
- Somalia: n/a
- Ethiopia: n/a

Languages
- Somali, Arabic and English

Religion
- Islam ^{(Sunni, Sufism)}

Related ethnic groups
- Biimaal, Gadabuursi, Fiqi Mohamed, Saleban Abdalle, Issa (clan), Surre groups.

Qubeys قبيس سر در is a branch of the Surre subclan of the Somali people, which is in turn a branch of the greater Mehe Dir tribe. Qubeys is brother to Abdalle Surre Dir. Surre (Abdalle & Qubeys)

== History & overview ==
Qubeys قبيس, along with Abdalle, are a subclan of the Surre (clan). Surre Mehe is a member of the Royal Dir tribe.

The Word Qubeys is an ancient Somali word which was once common amongst the traditional Somali population. The word itself means cleanliness. With the introduction of Islam and the Arabic language to Somalia over 1000 years ago, Somalis changed the tradition of naming their sons Qubeys to Dahir or Tahir or طاهر in Arabic which also means cleanliness.

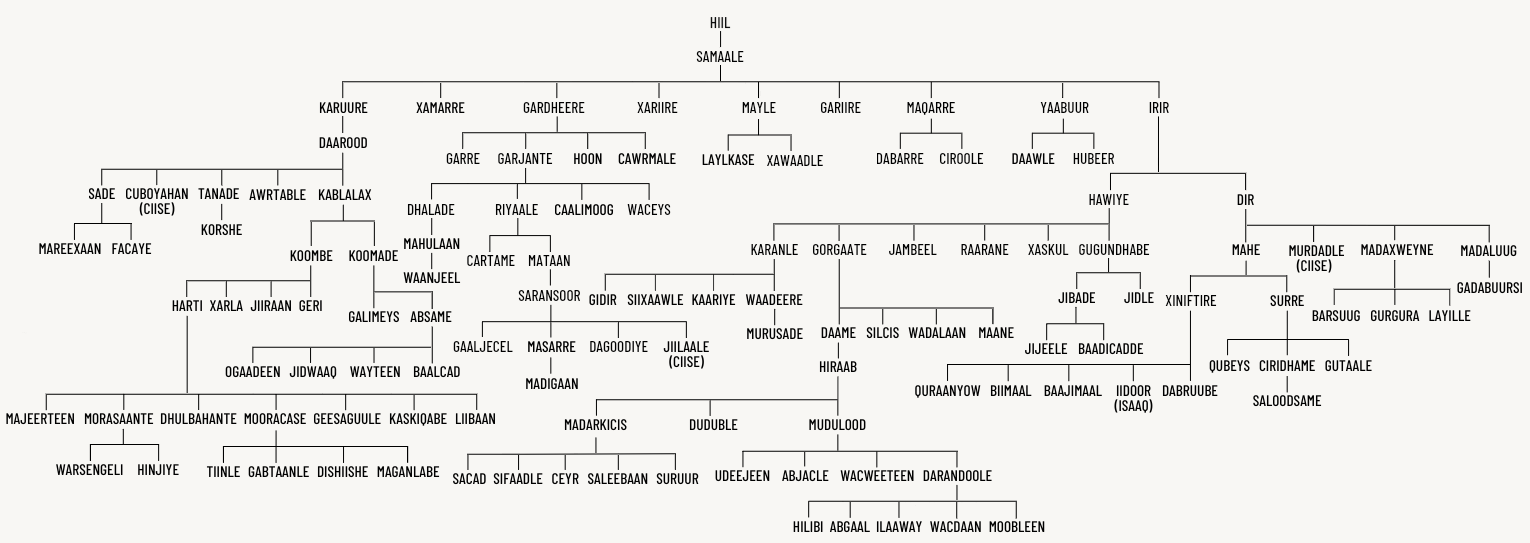
Genealogical tree of Somali clans

The Qubeys and Abdalleh Surre Dir clans are known to have spread and taught the Islamic religion in southern and central Somalia. With the modern Somali society, it is believed that the Surre, both Qubeys & Abdalle have a large number of Faqīh (Islamic Jurists) and Islamic scholars.

== Distribution of Qubeys clan in the Horn of Africa ==
It is believed by various historians the Qubeys Surre & Abdalle Surre migrated from the northern part of Somalia currently known as Somaliland approximately 1316 A.D. The Surre Clan migrated to parts of southern and central Somalia as well as parts of Ethiopia. However a small fraction of the Qubeys clan remained in Somaliland and reside in Togdheer Somaliland till this day.

Currently the Qubeys Clan reside in the following cities. Some which they inhabit alone and some where they are the majority or a significant population of the city:

- Bacadweyne Mudug
- Marajiicley Galgaduud
- Baraagciise
- Qaydaro
- Dhaah
- wardheen
- madiino
- Kabxanley
- deefow
- Qaycad
- Gawaaney
- Jaqey
- Qobor
- Jamaame
- Labaceel
- jiicdheere
- Luuq
- doolow
- shabeelow
- Golweyn
- salagle
- Somaliland
- Ethiopia
- dharkeynley
- cabdicasiis

== Clan tree ==
- Dir
- Mehe
- Surre
- Qubeys

1-Tolweyne

      - AxadooBe
        - Abdalla diidshe
            - reer Qoobweyne
            - reer Lugey
            - reer kheyre Afrax Reer Dhoore
          - reer Shirwac Jimcaale
            - reer waambe
            - reer wehliye
        - cusmaan Diidshe
            - reer Fiqi Yuusuf
            - reer Ebeker
            - reer Yaaquub
            - reer Abdirahmaan
            - reer Idiris
            - reer fiqi Cumar
            - reer Barqadle
            - Reer Muumin Cali
            - reer Gadiid Nuure
            - Reer Geedi Gurey
            - reer Ducaale faarax
            - Reer Xassan dheere
      - Reer Toonle
        - mohamed abti-udug
      - . 4 Roqore mohamed
    - 1.Roble Roble
    - 2.Bahuuri Roqor
    - 3.Diinyo Roqor
    - 4.Ali Roqor
  - Reer Shiikh Xuseen
    - Fiqi Yaxye
    - Fiqi Cumar
      - Reer Rooble
      - Reer Aw Macalin
      - Reer Aw Aamin
      - Reer Aw Cismaan
      - Fiqi Walaal
        - Reer Aw Caalin
        - Maxamed Yarre
        - Maxamuud Wayne
        - Samafale
        - Cumar
        - Cabdi
        - Abiikar
        - Reer Xaaji Cabdalle
          - Reer Maxamed ( Reer Shirwac)
          - Cabdi Dhuub
          - Reer Macalin
          - Cali Nuure
          - Reer Cismaan Madoobe
            - Reer Faarax Dheere
            - Reer Fiqi Aadan

2-Yabadhaale

      - Midkasse
    - Madoowe
            - Reer Cufaa

1)Reer Sheekh Faarax

  - Axmad Faarax

Rage ahmed Liiban Ahmed Salax Ahmed

  - Afrax Faarax
    - Food Faarax

2)Reer idiris 3) Reer cabdi dheere

            - Reer cusmaan afey
      - Wayaagle
            - reer baani
