= Dhahar District =

District in Sanaag, Somalia

Dhahar District Degmada Dhahar
- District
- Location of Dhahar District in Sanaag, Somalia
- Country: Somaliland
- Region: Sanaag
- Capital: Dhahar
- Time zone: UTC+3 (EAT)

Dhahar District (Somali: Degmada Dhahar) is an administrative district in the Sanaag region.

In the administrative divisions of Somaliland, it is a C-class district according to the 2019 Local Government Law.

In the administrative division of Puntland, the district is the capital of the Haylan region.

== Recent History ==
In April 2012, Somaliland forces in Dhahar district paid their soldiers' salaries in Somaliland shillings for the first time, having previously been paid in Somali shillings.

In July 2015, a knowledge contest was held in Dhahar City with representatives from six areas of Dhahar District, with Horseed area taking first place, Hodman area taking second place, and New Dhahar area taking third place.

In May 2018, the Puntland forces left Af Urur village in Dhahar district, and in June 2019, al-Shabaab militants took over the village.

In February 2020, construction began on the first 1.5 km paved road in the Dhahar district.

In March 2021, Puntland forces used live ammunition against demonstrators supporting the Federal Government of Somalia in Dhahar district. The Federal Government condemned Puntland's actions.

In June 2022, at a meeting in Erigavo city, which is effectively controlled by Somaliland, it was resolved that the Warsangali community is fully part of the Somaliland community and that the Somaliland government will elevate the Dhahar district to a region.

In October 2022, Puntland's Minister of Rural Development visited Dhahar. According to this report, Dhahar is controlled by Puntland and is garrisoned by the Puntland Army.

In February 2023, the Somaliland government accused the Puntland government of forcing the residents of Dhahar to participate in the Puntland elections.

In September 2023, Puntland parliamentarians from Dhahar criticized Puntland's political parties for not being involved in the agreements made between them, claiming that this would delay the democratic process in Puntland.

== See also ==
- Administrative divisions of Somaliland
- Regions of Somaliland
- Districts of Somaliland
- Somalia–Somaliland border
