= Somaliland Civil War =

Somaliland Civil War may refer to:

- Somaliland War of Independence (1981-1991)
- Somali civil war (2009–present)
- Puntland–Somaliland dispute (1998–present)
- Las Anod conflict (2023–present)
