= Dhahar =

Town in Somalia

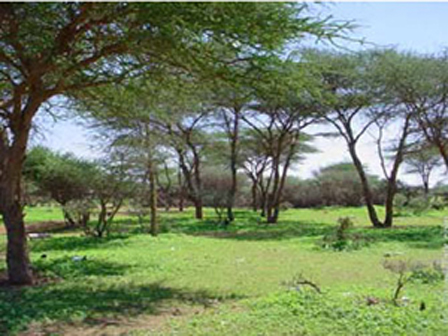
- Dhahar countryside

- Location Dhahar (Somaliland)
- Coordinates: 9°44′52.8″N 48°49′11.6″E
- Country: Disputed Puntland with Somaliland
- Region: Sanaag or Haylan
- District: Dhahar District

Population (2002)
  - Total: 6,000
- Time zone: UTC+3 (EAT)

Dhahar is a town in the eastern Sanaag region, and the capital of the Dhahar District. Reuters reports Dhahar as a Puntland town in 2021, but also reports how it condemns President Puntland and supports President Somalia. Somali Broadcasting Corporation reports in 2019 that Dhahar is a town effectively controlled by Somaliland. One Central and North West London NHS Foundation Trust, an NHS Foundation Trust in England, researcher describes Dhahar as a district in Puntland in 2014.

== Overview ==
The town is disputed between Somaliland and Puntland, who has significant influence in the town. In November 2009, Puntland and Somaliland forces clashed near Dhahar.

In 2016 an incident occurred between the two entities in Boodda-Cad, a remote settlement 30km west of Dhahar. According to Somaliland MP, Baar Said Farah, the skirmishes took place away from Dhahar. A Somaliland National Armies base is present in the town where the 93rd division is positioned.

In January 2018, Gamal Mohamed Hassan, the Minister of Planning and International Cooperation visited Dhahar, as well as the city of Badhan in the Sanaag region along with Puntland government officials.

In March 2021 police fired into the air to disperse pro-Farmaajo/anti Deni demonstrators in Dhahar district.

In August 2022, Puntland President Said Abdullahi Dani visited Dhahar and laid the foundation for a road connecting Dhahar and Hingalol. The 45 km road between Dhahar and Sheerbi is almost complete, but the road between Dhahar and Hingalol is only 20 km out of 70 km.

In May 2023, the Puntland Minister of Livestock, the Deputy Minister of Commerce of Puntland, and the Governor of Haylan region of Puntland visited Dhahar.

In September 2023, 24 of the 33 Dhahar district representatives, including the ruling party Kaah, opposed Local Law No. 7 agreed to in the capital by the political parties in Puntland.

In October 2023, Haylan region governor of Puntland and others visited Dhahar.

=== July 2025 clashes ===
On July 15, heavy fighting broke out in Dhahar between Puntland forces and local clan militias loyal to SSC-Khatumo, leaving dozens of people and regional forces dead. The clashes began after Puntland forces, in particular members of Puntland's Maritime Police Force (PMPF) moved into Dhahar to dismantle newly established security checkpoints. The fierce gunfight, lasting hours, killed four soldiers and wounded ten others. The fighting coincided with a clan conference currently underway in Las Anod, where members of the Warsangeli and Dhulbahante clans are discussing the formation of a new federal member state, pushed by the federal government in Mogadishu. That same day the Puntland parliament voted to expel Abdirashid Yusuf Jibril days after authorities issued an arrest warrant. Puntland president Said Abdullahi Deni had also previously issued a stern warning, holding the federal government responsible for attempts to incorporate Sanaag into SSC-Khatumo. Somalia's Ministry of Interior urged Puntland to withdraw troops deployed to Dhahar.

== See also ==
- Administrative divisions of Somaliland
- Regions of Somaliland
- Districts of Somaliland
- Somalia–Somaliland border

== External sites ==
- Dhahar: Somalia, geographic.org
