= Albu Gulak =

Albu Gulak آلبوگولک
- Village
- Location within Iran
- Coordinates: 30°38′17″N 48°43′05″E
- Country: Iran
- Province: Khuzestan
- County: Shadegan
- Bakhsh: Central
- Rural District: Abshar

Population (2006)
  - Total: 390
- Time zone: UTC+3:30 (IRST)
  - Summer (DST): UTC+4:30 (IRDT)

Albu Gulak (Persian: آلبوگولک, also Romanized as Ālbū Gūlak; also known as Al Bakūlak) is a village in Abshar Rural District, in the Central District of Shadegan County, Khuzestan Province, Iran. At the 2006 census, its population was 390, in 66 families.
