= Surre (clan) =

Ethnic group

Surre سري
- Dir Somali Clan
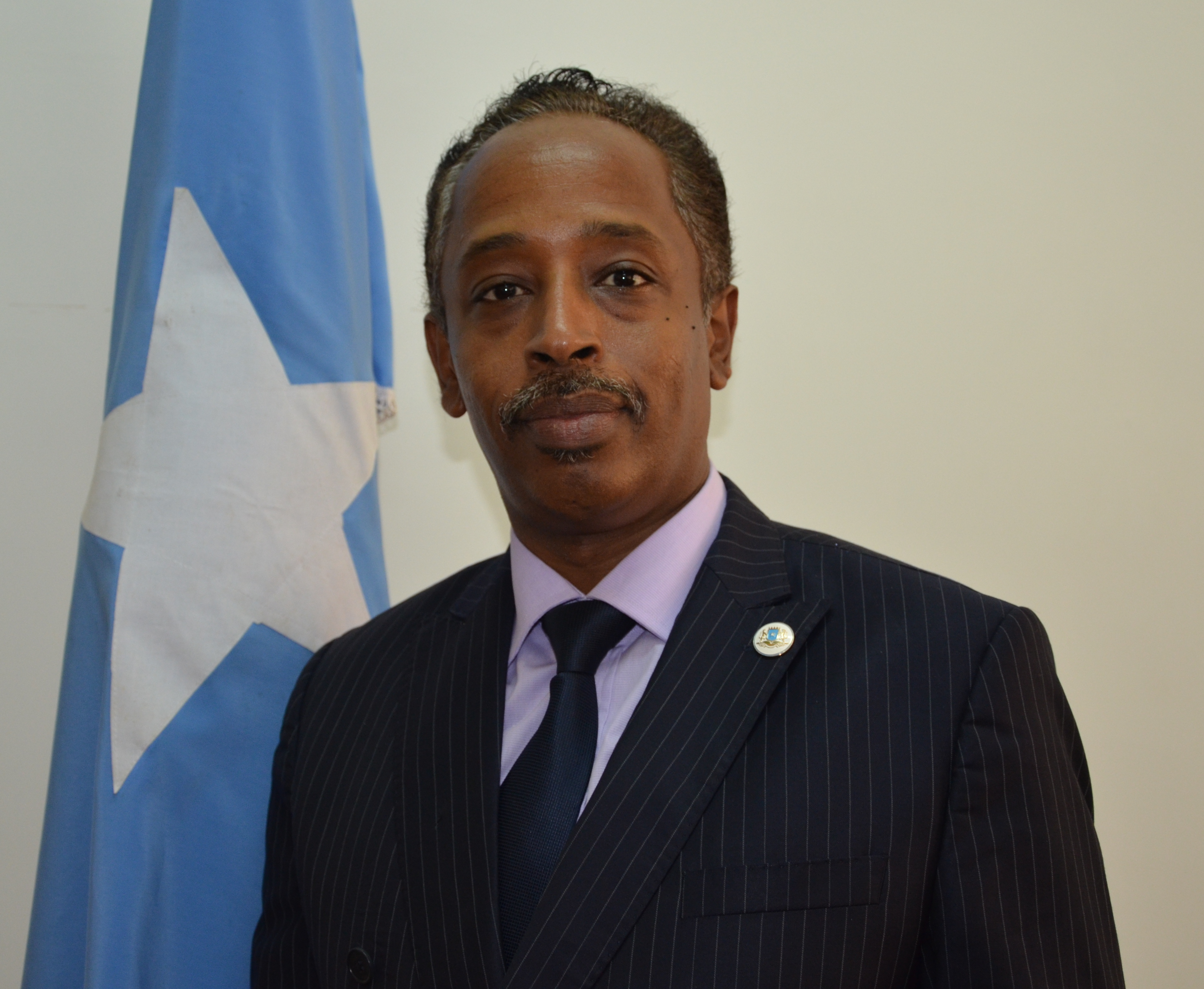
- Former Second deputy speaker
- Ethnicity: Somali
- Location: (Somalia) Somalia; Ethiopia
- Parent tribe: Dir
- Branches: Qubeys: Tolweyne; Reer Toonle .Mohamed Abti Udug .Waqatinle Abti Udug Axadoowe: Yabadhaale; Midkase Wayaagle Abdalle: Mohammed Abdalle; Yusuf Abdalle; Abdi Abdalle; Suleiman Abdalle
- Language: (Somalia) Somali (Arab League) Arabic
- Religion: Islam (Sunni)

The Surre (Somali: Surre, Arabic: سري), is a Somali clan, a sub clan of the major Somali Dir clan, The Surre inhabit in central and southern Somalia. And also can be found in Somaliland, and Ethiopia.

== History ==
A photo of the highly admired young Sheekh Yussuf Direed

The Surre have been associated with spreading the Islamic faith in Somalia and the Qadiriya Sufi tariiqa in central and southern Somalia. They left what is now Somaliland in approximately 1316 C.E. for central and southern Somalia.

The majority of the western scholars (both Italian and British) simply referred to the Surre as the "Dir of Puntland and Southcentral Somalia" without differentiating them.

Recent studies in Somalia revealed that the Dir in Nugal, Mudug, Galgaduud, Hiran, and Gedo are divided into two branches, the Qubeys and the Guutaale both descendants of Surre.

As of 1996 the Surre were represented by the Southern Somali National Movement led by Abdi Aziz Sheikh Yusuf.

== Distribution ==
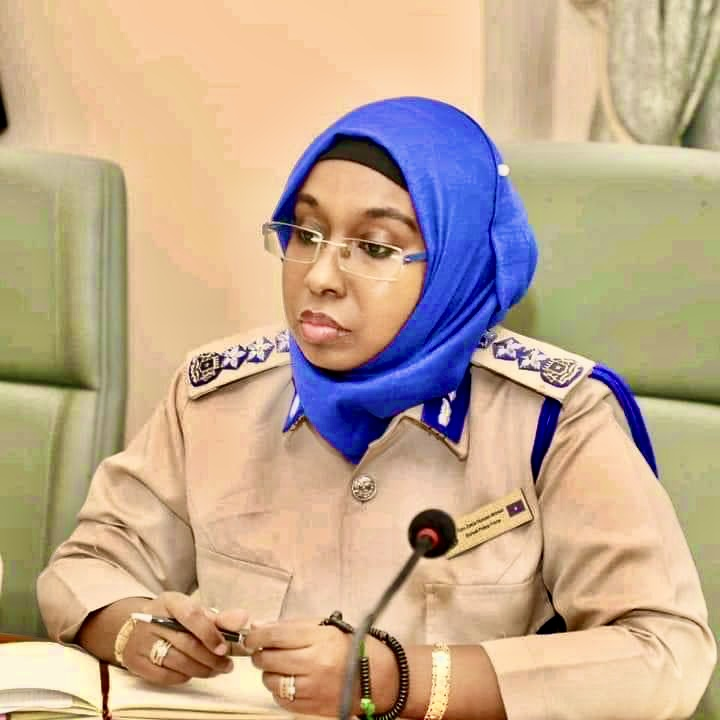
Zakia Hussein Somalia's deputy police chief and first ever female brigadier general

Mainly Qubeys, the Abdalles and Mohamed Gutale(Habardeel) are the Surre subclans. The Saleban Abdalle clan is mainly local to Puntland, especially in the regions of Nugal and Mudug and predominantly inhabit Tawfiiq District, Dahraan neighborhood of Galkayo of Mudug and Godobjiran of Nugaal and have a sizable presence in Bosaso.

Another cluster of Abdalle clan of mainly Fiqi Mohamad reside from Herale district of Galgaduud region in Galmudug State all the way to the north of Jubba river in Gedo region of Jubaland state mainly in Boholgaras and towns surrounding it divided by the Ethiopian border there, the Fiqi Mohamad and Nacdoor of Abdalle predominantly inhabit Dolobay Woreda, with significant population in Chereti (woreda) both in Afder Zone and Jijiga the capital of the Somali state.

The Qubeys Clan is mainly native to Bacadweyne district as well as many towns under its jurisdiction and in Galkayo in Mudug region of Galmudug State, the Fiqi walal Qubeys also reside Tawfiiq and areas around it along with their Abdalle brothers, Mirjiicley town of Herale district. The Surre have a sizable presence in both the capital Mogadishu and Lower Shabelle where the qubeys resides the town of Golweyn and have a significant presence in Merca.

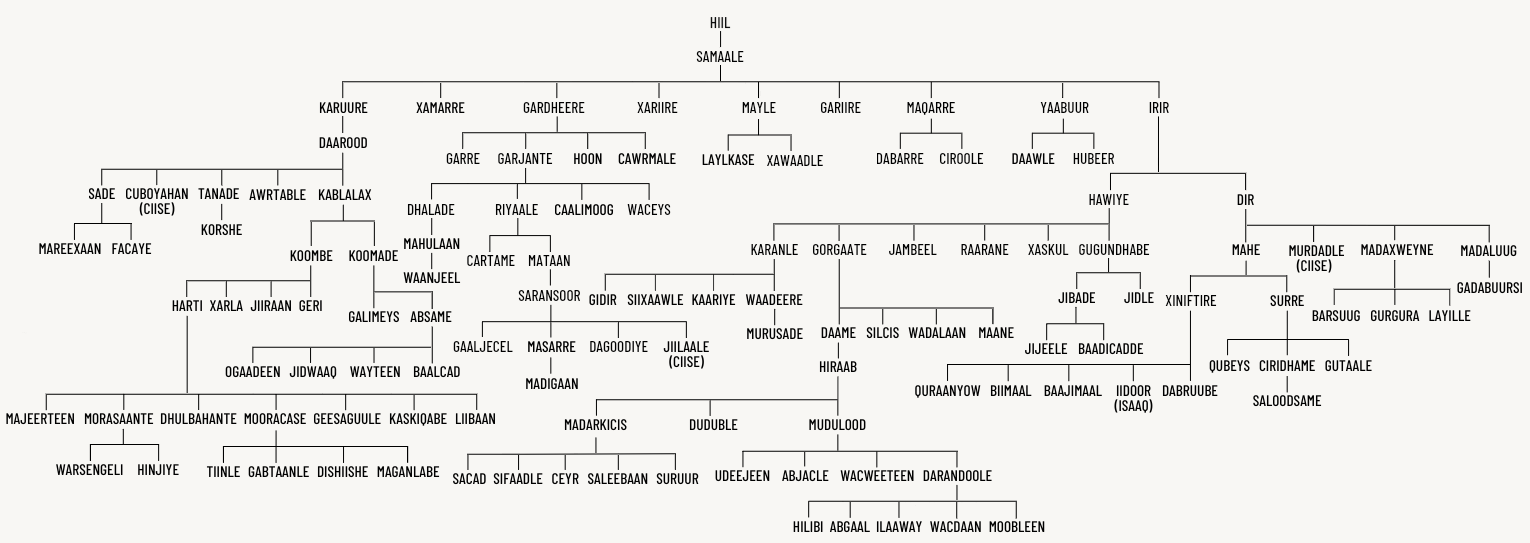
Genealogical tree of Somali clans

A sub subclan of Surre also inhabit in the Sanaag region of Somaliland, with the Cabaas Muuse sub subclan being present in Badhan District.

== Clan tree ==
The Surre clan members preserved their lineage and is as follows. Some lineages are also omitted.

- Dir
- Mehe
  - Surre
    - Qubeys
      - Tolweyne
      - Ahadoobe
        - Abdalle Diidshe
        - Ismaan Diidshe
      - Reer Toonle
        - Fiqi Cumar
        - Fiqi Yahye
      - Yabadhaale
        - Midkasse
        - Wayaagle
    - Habardeel
    - Abdalle
      - Mohamed Abdalle(Na’door)
      - Yusuf Abdalle(Gorod)
      - Abdi Abdalle
        - Fiqi Mohamed
        - Adan farah ( laxmar)
      - Saleban Abdalle
        - Fiqi Khayrre
        - Muuse Farah

== Notable members ==
- Mahad Abdalle Awad - current second deputy speaker of the Federal Parliament of Somalia
- Qamar Aden Ali - Late former Somali minister of Health
- Abdikarim Yusuf Adam(dhagabadan) - Late former Army Chief of staff Somali Armed Forced
- Zakia Hussein - A politician and current deputy police of Somalia
- Qadar Ahmed Isse - PhD scholar and Researcher.
