= Nahr-e Hoseyn =

Nahr-e Hoseyn نهرحسين
- Village
- Location within Iran
- Coordinates: 30°37′32″N 48°42′39″E
- Country: Iran
- Province: Khuzestan
- County: Shadegan
- Bakhsh: Central
- Rural District: Abshar

Population (2006)
  - Total: 1,142
- Time zone: UTC+3:30 (IRST)
  - Summer (DST): UTC+4:30 (IRDT)

Nahr-e Hoseyn (Persian: نهرحسين, also Romanized as Nahr-e Ḩoseyn) is a village in Abshar Rural District, in the Central District of Shadegan County, Khuzestan Province, Iran. At the 2006 census, its population was 1,142, in 211 families.
