= Flag of Maakhir =

Flag of Maakhir, May 1, 2008 – January 11, 2009

Flag of Maakhir, July 1, 2007 – May 1, 2008

Flag of Maakhir

The flag of Maakhir, de facto autonomous region of Somalia, was originally established with the declaration of the first Maakhir government and the emergency in Maakhir of early 2008, when President Jibrell Ali Salad called for a new government to better address the needs of Maakhiris. A flag to replace the Flag of Somalia was then proposed and adopted for Maakhir. The region dissolved in 2009.
