= Nahr-e Shanaveh =

Nahr-e Shanaveh نهرشناوه
- Village
- Country: Iran
- Province: Khuzestan
- County: Shadegan
- Bakhsh: Central
- Rural District: Abshar

Population (2006)
  - Total: 286
- Time zone: UTC+3:30 (IRST)
  - Summer (DST): UTC+4:30 (IRDT)

Nahr-e Shanaveh (Persian: نهرشناوه, also Romanized as Nahr-e Shanāveh) is a village in Abshar Rural District, in the Central District of Shadegan County, Khuzestan Province, Iran. At the 2006 census, its population was 286, in 50 families.
