= Nahr-e Soltan =

Nahr-e Soltan نهرسلطان
- Village
- Location within Iran
- Coordinates: 30°35′52″N 48°43′07″E
- Country: Iran
- Province: Khuzestan
- County: Shadegan
- Bakhsh: Central
- Rural District: Abshar

Population (2006)
  - Total: 421
- Time zone: UTC+3:30 (IRST)
  - Summer (DST): UTC+4:30 (IRDT)

Nahr-e Soltan (Persian: نهرسلطان, also Romanized as Nahr-e Solṭān) is a village in Abshar Rural District, in the Central District of Shadegan County, Khuzestan Province, Iran. At the 2006 census, its population was 421, in 79 families.
