= Saleban Abdalle =

Somali sub-clan

Saleban Abdalle سليمان عبدالله

Languages
- Somali, Arabic and English

Religion
- Islam ^{(Sunni, Sufism)}

Related ethnic groups
- Fiqi mohamed, Qubeys and other Surre groups.

Saleban Abdalle (Somali: Saleebaan Cabdalle, Arabic: سليمان عبدالله), is a Somali sub-clan. It forms a part of the Surre subdivision of the major Somali Dir clan.

== Overview & Distribution ==
The Saleban Abdalle are mainly pastoralists who depend on cattle in rural areas and in urban settlements they are mostly merchants and business people

The Saleban Abdalle clan Muuse Faarahs are mainly local to Puntland especially in the regions of Nugal and Mudug and predominantly inhabit Tawfiiq District, Dahraan neighborhood of Galkayo of Mudug region and Godobjiran of Nugaal region, Gargoore in Isku Shuban and have a sizable presence in Bosaso the business capital of Puntland state and in Mogadishu, the capital city of Somalia.

The Abbas Muuse (Cabaas Muuse) reside in areas around Laasqoray and Badhan in the Sanaag region of Somaliland.

Mohamud Farah known as Fiqi Khayre inhabit the Shekosh (woreda) in Korahe zone of the Somali region in Ethiopia.

== Clan tree ==
As the Saleban Abdalle are a sub-clan, members preserved their lineage and is as follows. Some lineages are also omitted.

- Dir
- Mehe
  - Surre
    - Abdalle
      - Saleban Abdalle
      - Mohamud (Fiqi khayrre)
      - Muuse Faarah
        - Samatar
          - Daba' (Dabac)
          - Agoon
          - Beyr
          - Omar Muse
        - Abbas( Abbas Muse)
        - Siyaad
        - Cumar (Dudbis)
        - Food Ade
        - Haaruun (Shiil)
        - Habbad (Xabbad)

== Notable members ==
- 1. Abdullahi Ahmed Bulqaas - Late one of Puntland state founders
- 2. Mahad Abdalle Awad - current second deputy speaker of the Federal Parliament of Somalia
- 3. Sayidomar Aden Guled - Puntland State minister of Health
- 4. Qamar Adan ALi - Late former Somali minister of Health
