= Puntland–Somaliland dispute =

Territorial dispute in the Horn of Africa

- Part of the Somali Civil War
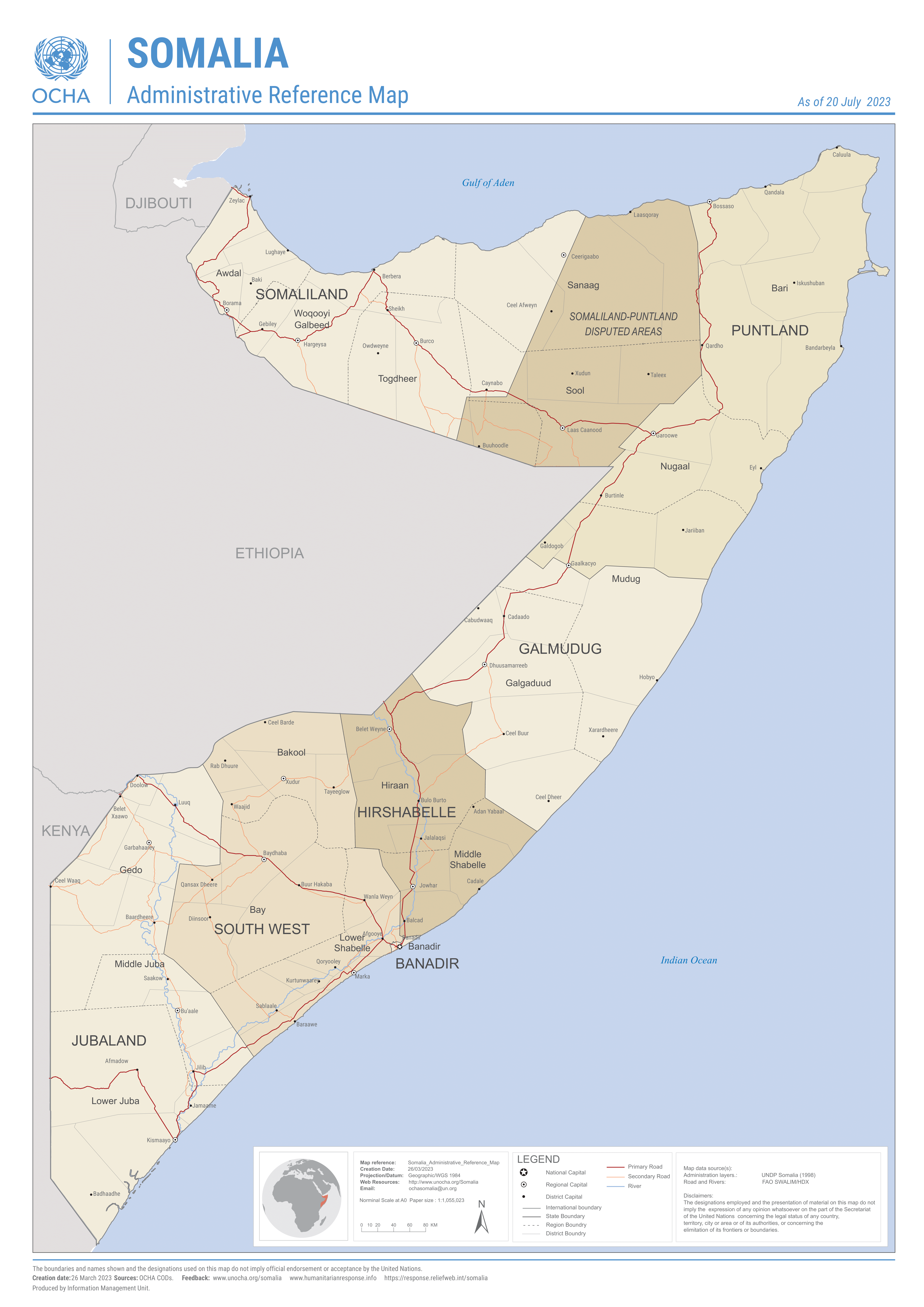
- Map of areas claimed by Somalia showing the areas disputed between Somaliland and Puntland
Date	1998 – present
Location	Sool, Sanaag & Togdheer region
Result	Ongoing: Puntland forces expelled from the Sool and Sanaag region before 2023
Territorial changes	Khatumo forces partially seize the Sool and region from Somaliland and reintegrate it into the Federal Government of Somalia

Belligerents
Somaliland	Puntland

Commanders and leaders
Abdirahman Mohamed Abdullahi; Former: Muhammad Haji Ibrahim Egal (1993 – 2002); Dahir Riyale Kahin (2002 – 2010); Ahmed Mohamed Mohamoud (2010 – 2017); Muse Bihi Abdi (2017 – 2024)	Said Abdullahi Deni; Abdikhadir Ahmed Aw-Ali; Former: Abdullahi Yusuf Ahmed; Yusuf Haji Nur; Jama Ali Jama; Mohamed Abdi Hashi; Mohamud Muse Hersi; Abdirahman Farole; Abdiweli Gaas; Hassan Sheikh Mohamud; Hamza Abdi Barre

Strength
3,000 men: 4 tanks and 40 armed vehicles	2,300 men: 24 armed vehicles with 2 tanks

Casualties and losses
30 killed and 3 captured as POW	Over 100 killed and 140 captured as pow

The Puntland–Somaliland dispute is an ongoing dispute and conflict over the provinces of Sool, Sanaag and Cayn of Togdheer regions between the self-declared Republic of Somaliland and the Puntland State of Somalia.

== Background ==
=== 1894 border ===
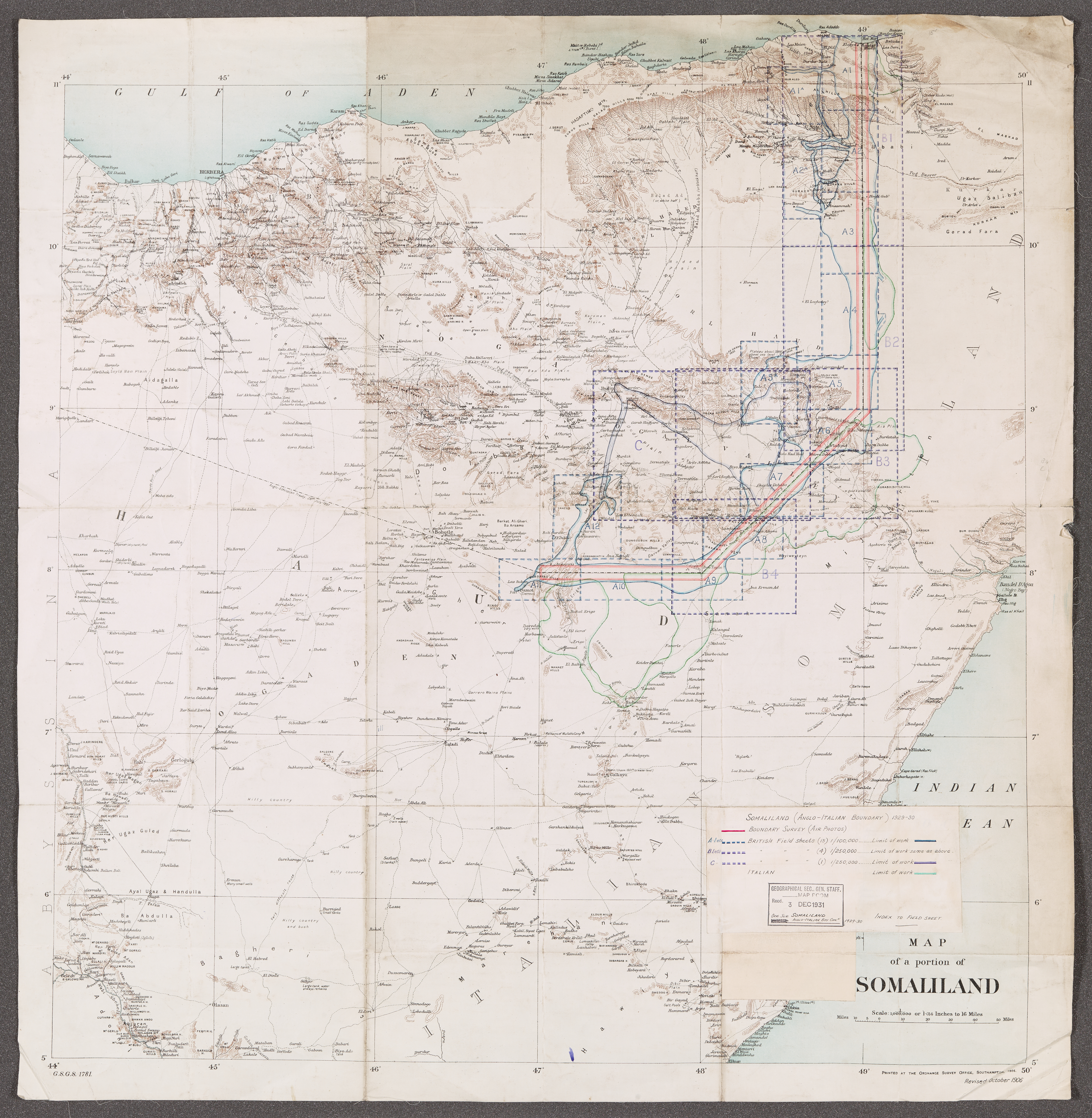
Map showing the eastern boundaries of Somaliland by the Somaliland Treaties. The Anglo-Italian Boundary.

The territory was historically part of British Somaliland, a British protectorate that was granted independence in 1960 and then formed a union with neighboring Italian colony Trust Territory of Somaliland to form the Somali Republic. When the Somaliland War of Independence was concluded and the Somali Civil War broke out, Somaliland declared independence from Somalia in 1991 as a successor state to the British protectorate and declared independence from Somalia.

The dispute started in 1998, when Puntland was formed as an autonomous state of Somalia and declared the region as part of its territory based on tribal affiliation of the locals.

=== Clan border ===
Puntland claims Sool, Sanaag and Cayn based on kinship ties with the regions' dominant Darod clans. Somaliland claims the territory as part of the original boundaries of the former British Somaliland protectorate, which the self-declared country regards itself as the successor to. Fighting between the two forces led to casualties and captured prisoners, who were later exchanged.

In 2010, the Dhulbahante clan declared the independence of the HBM-SSC, and when that failed, in 2012, proclaimed the independence of Khatumo State, claiming all three territories for themselves independent of both Somaliland and Puntland, thereby forming a new, third faction in the conflict. However, Khatumo State also lost territorial control around 2015.

=== Sanaag ===
Sanaag is a disputed region, claimed as sovereign territory by Somaliland and Puntland State of Somalia.

One of the battlefront as of 2021 is between Yubbe (Somaliland) and Hadaftimo (Puntland).

The dispute with the Transitional Federal Government (TFG) stems from the passage of the new Charter in November 2004. However, this was not a pragmatic issue until the military successes of the government in the 2006–2009 war in Somalia. Assertions of sovereignty in January 2007 by the TFG leadership sparked riots in Somaliland.

On 1 July 2007, the state of Maakhir was declared in eastern Sanaag. The polity's leaders claimed independence from both Puntland and Somaliland, but Maakhir was later officially incorporated into Puntland in January 2009.

On 20 July 2013, an agreement between local elders in the south of Sanaag Region and the Government of Somaliland led to the defection of the fighters in an attempt to combine the previously warring forces. "We had discussions and we agreed to work together on security in the area," Somaliland information minister Abdullahi Ukuse, adding that "the defecting force is made up of 500 fighters, 13 technicals and six lorries. These fighters were previously adversaries of the [Somaliland] military. The two forces are now one army." Other sources estimated that somewhere between 500 and 800 soldiers defected and integrated with the Somaliland National Army. A defecting Khatumo state commander said he was happy that he joined the Somaliland troops, promising to help beef up security in the region.

On 12 June 2014, heavily armed Somaliland National Army entered Hingalol town. According to Puntland MP Abdihakim Abdullahi, they arrived in 13 battle wagons and were repeatedly told by local elders to leave the town or they would encounter resistance. Puntland elder Garad Abdullahi Ali Eid similarly indicated that before the Somaliland forces' began their march toward the area, Puntland clan elders had met with them and requested that they not enter the town ahead of a scheduled June 15 clan convention.

=== Sool ===
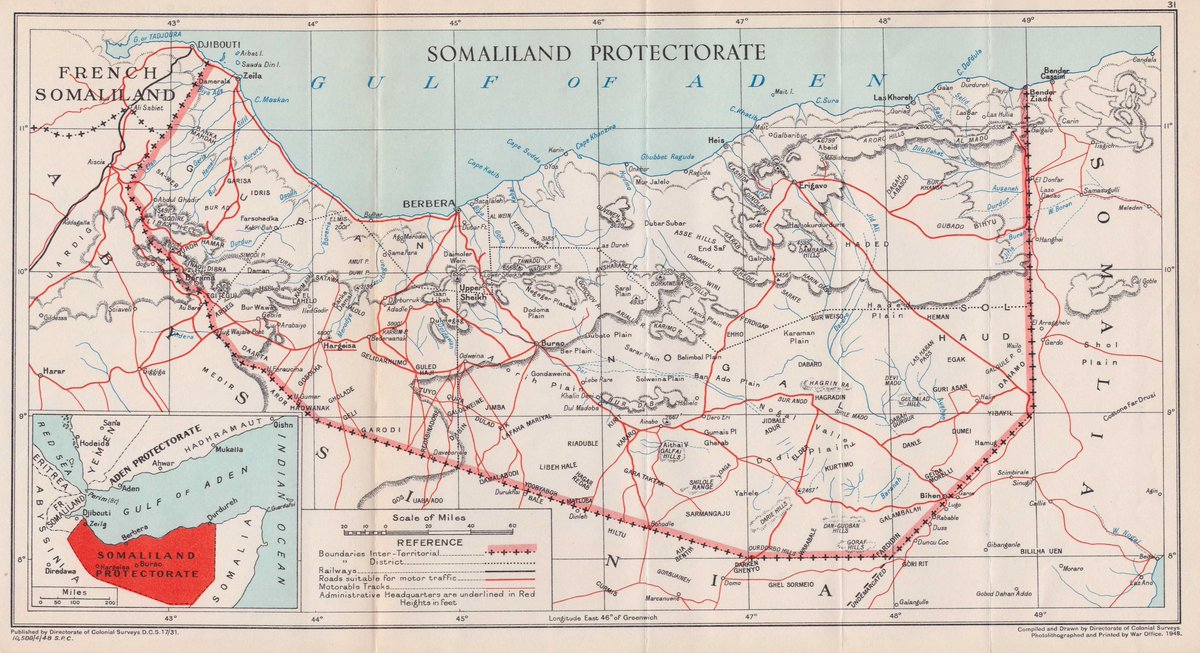
British Somaliland Borders. Somaliland has claimed this entire area.

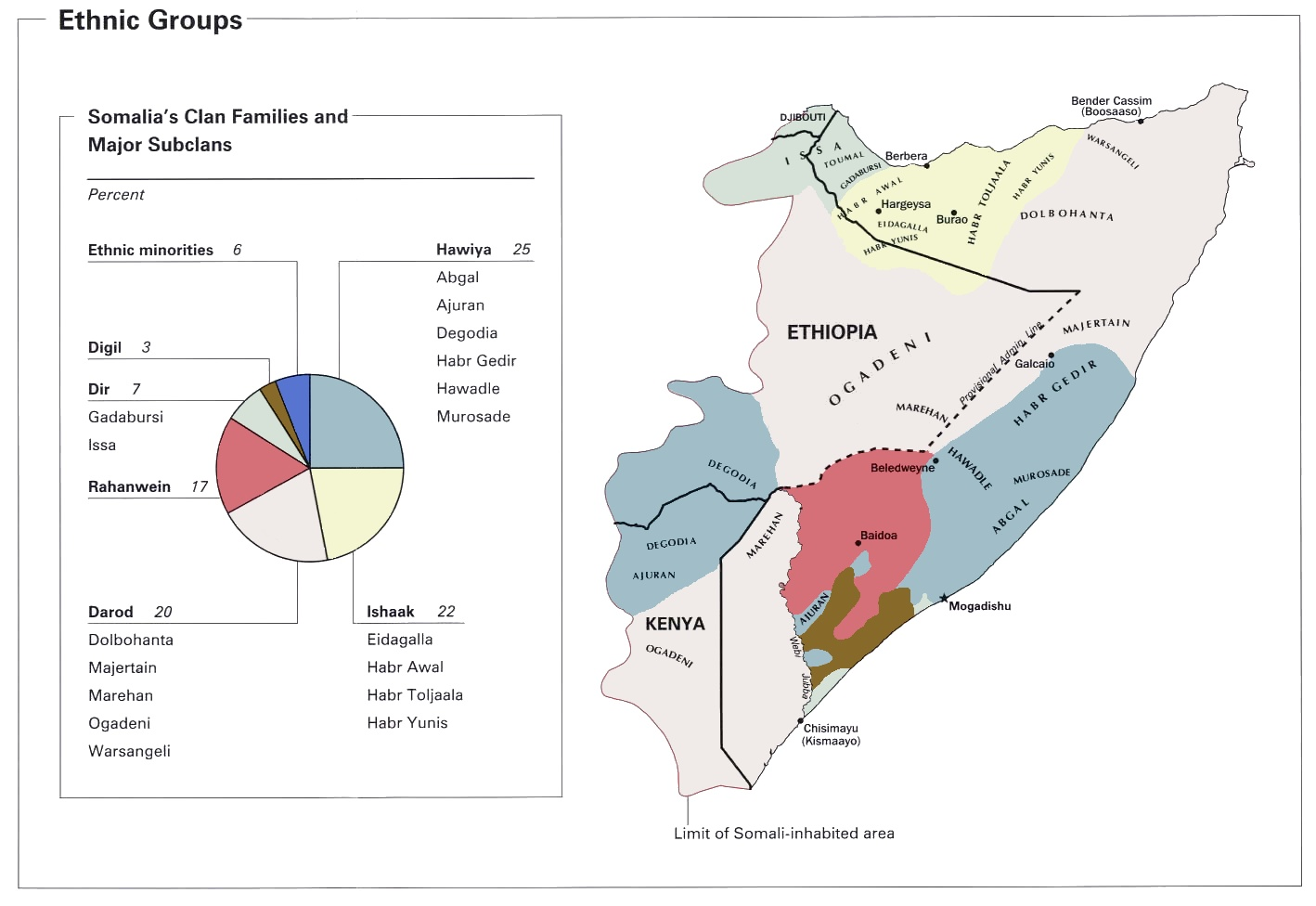
Clan distribution in Northeastern Africa. Puntland has claimed the Darod inhabited area within the former northeastern Somalia.

Sool is a free region, claimed as sovereign territory by both the Somaliland and Puntland State of Somalia. Under the government of Siad Barre, Sool was not a separate region, but part of the larger Sool province, with the capital city of Garowe. It was separated from Nugaal in the 1980s.

According to the UN Security Council, on 17 September 2007, fighting broke out between forces loyal to the self-declared independent republic of Somaliland and the semi-autonomous region of Puntland in Laascaanood, the capital of the disputed Sool region. Although the fighting started as a result of intra-clan tensions, it continued sporadically through September, drawing security forces from both Somaliland and Puntland and resulting in a high number of casualties. My Special Representative and his team urged senior Somaliland and Puntland officials to de-escalate the situation and reduce tensions in the region. In October, the situation in the Sool and Sanaag regions deteriorated further, with increased fighting between both parties. On 15 October, after heavy fighting which resulted in at least 10 deaths, Somaliland troops took control of Laascaanood. In the aftermath, Puntland mobilized its forces to regain control of the area and repel what they considered an invasion by Somaliland authorities and foreign elements. Somaliland rejected the allegations and vowed to continue the struggle until the region was liberated. In Sool, clashes were reported in Taleh on 28 November between armed men from the Dhulbahante clan and Puntland forces. Those clashes reportedly resulted in the killing of 12 people, including 11 civilians, and injury to several others. Somaliland was relatively calm. Isolated armed clashes were reported in the disputed Sool, Sanaag, and Cayn regions on 27 and 28 November. Tension was high in early December following reports of a military build-up along the border between Somaliland and Puntland, but no further incidents were reported. Tension between Puntland and Somaliland increased over the contested Sool and Sanaag regions. The visit by the President of Somaliland, Ahmed Mohamed Mohamoud Silanyo, to the coastal town of Laasqoray in the disputed Sanaag region on 16 March triggered a military build-up from both sides. Accusations made by senior Puntland officials that Somaliland was supporting Al-Shabaab further strained relations. Somaliland refuted the allegations and called upon the Federal Government to intervene. On 15 April, Somaliland deployed its forces to the disputed Sool region and, on the same day, occupied the town of Taleex. The troops left the town the next day, after less than 24 hours. Tension in the disputed Sool region grew when Somaliland forces seized the town of Taleex on 12 June and disrupted a conference organized by leaders, elders and supporters of the self-declared Khatumo State. The tension escalated when the Government of Puntland reinforced its military presence in the contested region. On 26 June, Somaliland forces withdrew from Taleex, leaving behind a pro-Somaliland Dhulbahante militia. The Khatumo leaders relocated to Saaxdheer, an area in the Sool region near the Ethiopian border, from where one of the Khatumo founders and a parliamentarian, Ali Khalif Galayr, was elected the new President of Khatumo on 14 August. On 27 August, Somaliland forces captured Saaxdheer and have since occupied the area. In the northern region of Sool, claimed by both Somaliland and Puntland, fighting resulted in several deaths among various rival Dhulbahante sub-clans with opposing loyalties to Somaliland, Puntland and the Khatumo aspiration. Armed Forces of Somaliland intervened in the fighting and are currently based in Sadher, near the Ethiopian border. Western areas of Somaliland remained relatively peaceful, while the Sool, Sanaag and Cayn regions experienced intermittent armed clashes between Somaliland forces and militias supporting aspirations for a new state of Khatumo. In February, attacks by Dulbahante militia supporting the separatist Khatumo movement against Somaliland forces in the Sool and Sanaag regions resulted in the death of one Somaliland and two Khatumo combatants; the security situation stabilized in March, however.

A rebellion of the Dhulbahante clan in Las Anod in December 2022 led to the secession of the clan from Somaliland and they declared the establishment of SSC-Khatumo in February 2023. In August, Somaliland forces have retreated to the area of Oog, and confrontations with the insurgents have continued. However, as of April 2024, it is confirmed that no major fighting has occurred.

=== Ayn ===
The area, centered on the town of Buuhoodle, is also disputed by Somaliland and Puntland. According to Somaliland, the so-called Ayn (Somali: Cayn) area claimed by Puntland remains part of the Togdheer region. Somaliland disputes the territorial claims of Puntland, which wrote the claim on the portion of Togdheere into their 1998 charter. In 2011, tension between the two regions developed as a result of fighting between the Somaliland forces and militias belonging to Sool-Sanaag-Cayn, which were reportedly backed by neighbouring Puntland. Disagreement over water holes in the disputed area of Buuhoodle led to fighting in late February between the Somaliland army and Sool-Sanaag-Cayn militias; the latter was reportedly backed by Puntland forces. A tentative ceasefire has held since March, aided by Puntland’s withdrawal and Somaliland peacebuilding measures. However, Buuhoodle remains a militarized zone, and the conflict may resume as competition for water resources and pasture in drought-affected areas increases. After months of negotiations, initiated by the Somaliland President, a reconciliation conference was held from 23 to 26 June for the Sool region, between the Sool-Sanag-Cayn alliances and the Dhulbahante sub-clan. The conference resulted in an agreement covering prisoner release, illegal land-grabbing and digging of boreholes. Meanwhile, a survey organized by an officially appointed committee found support for an expansion in the number of political parties allowed to register. Las Anod experienced killings and violent attacks owing to the disagreement between Somaliland, Puntland and Sool-Sanag-Cayn alliances over territory. Somaliland forces and Sool-Sanag-Cayn militia fought in May, and Puntland and Somaliland clashed in August. Proposed oil drilling north of Las Anod by a commercial partner of Puntland added to existing tensions. The authorities in Puntland and Somaliland continued to exchange hostile rhetoric over the disputed regions of Sool and Sanaag. On 8 October, the President of Somaliland visited the disputed town of Laascaanood. In a press statement, the Puntland administration warned that this might ignite conflict in the area. On 9 November, Puntland warned Somaliland not to interfere in clan disputes and accused its administration of stirring up public unrest and causing the displacement of people in the Erigavo district of Sanaag region In 2012 Following a meeting between President Silanyo of Somaliland and Suleiman Esse Ahmed Haglatosie, the leader of the militia of the Sool, Sanaag and Cayn (SSC) regions of northern Somalia, in Dubai on 27 June, the SSC militia agreed to lay down arms and enter into talks with the Somaliland administration. The SSC leader promised to start disbanding his militia and hand over the weaponry at his disposal to the Somaliland administration. From 16 to 23 July 2012, Mr. Haglatosie also visited Garoowe to consult the Puntland leadership, seeking a negotiated end to the conflict in the region. In Somaliland, renewed military activities by the self-declared Khatumo State led to armed clashes in the disputed Sool, Sanaag and Cayn areas in June and July 2012. In addition, there was tension between Khatumo State and Puntland. Al-Shabaab undertook frequent troop movements from southern and central Somalia to Somaliland and Puntland, although the insurgents’ focus on those areas was more on recruitment than terrorist activity. Puntland also faced continuous challenges from the Al-Shabaab-linked Galgala insurgents, freelance militias, and pirates, whose criminal activities on the mainland intensified during the reporting period. Relations between Somaliland and Puntland remained strained. On 19 January, Dhulbahante clan leaders and politicians from Sool, Sanaag and Cayn announced the formation of a new administration, called Khatumo State. Sool and Sanaag regions are claimed by both Puntland and Somaliland, whose forces continued to clash over the control of towns and villages. This resulted in displacement and intensified clan wars over grazing, water and other natural resources. Demonstrations were held in support of the new administration, demanding the withdrawal of Somaliland troops from Laascaanood. The dispute between Somaliland and the newly proclaimed Khatumo State, in addition to clan-related violence, resulted in fatal clashes in Buuhoodle and Sool. While Al-Shabaab continued to lose ground in south-central Somalia, there were reports of it strengthening its alliance with militias in the Galgala mountain area in Puntland. Insurgents reportedly aligned with Al-Shabaab clashed with local authorities. Puntland’s security situation was also characterized by renewed hostility against foreign involvement in the exploitation of natural resources. Separately, in the Sool and Sanaag regions, tensions were reported on 4 May and 15 June following a Puntland military build-up around Tukaraq, Sool Region, and armed clashes between the Somaliland army and a militia that supports the separatist Khatumo movement.

== Armed clashes ==
=== 2007 Somaliland capture of Las Anod ===
In October 2007, the conflict mushroomed into a regional conflict over control of the city of Las Anod, as Somaliland regular army forces mobilized from their base in the town of Adhicadeeye, west of the city, and entered the conflict. Puntland was slow to mobilize a counter-attack, as Puntland's weak economy and overstretched military obligations in Mogadishu prevented a rapid response. After getting the city under its control, Somaliland moved Sool's regional administration into Las Anod. Between 10 and 20 people were reported to be dead.

=== 2010 clashes ===
In 2010, Ethiopian and Somaliland forces engaged an autonomist militia in northern Somalia's Sool region in a bid to pacify the region ahead of the 2010 Somaliland presidential election. While Ethiopian troops had entered southern Somalia to fight Islamist militants on previous occasions, this is believed to be the first time that they had done so in Somaliland, a region generally seen as more stable than Somalia.

=== 2016 clashes ===
On 18 July, at least five soldiers have been killed after Puntland and Somaliland troops clashed near Booda-Cadde in Sanaag. A Puntland army commander confirmed that three Puntland soldiers and two high ranking Somaliland military officers were killed.

Somaliland captured a prominent member of the Puntland administration, Mohamed Farah Adan, who was the former vice Minister of Justice and is currently a member of the Puntland parliament. He was detained for a week in Erigavo and released the following month. The conflict further intensified the long-standing territorial disputes between the two regions.

=== 2018 clashes ===
In January and May 2018, the Battle of Tukaraq between Somaliland and Puntland troops left 200 to 300 people dead and led to the displacement of 2700 families. At the end of July the Intergovernmental Authority on Development and United Nations Assistance Mission in Somalia mediated a ceasefire agreement between Somaliland and Puntland, but by the end of the year neither party publicly supported the terms of the agreement.

== Other viewpoints ==
Former president of Somalia Hassan Sheikh Mohamud stated his opinion whilst in office that Puntland is made up of two and a half regions (Bari, Nugal and northern Mudug), which goes against Puntland's claim of Sool and Sanaag.

Furthermore, in preparation for the Somali presidential election of 2017 the communiqué released by the office of Presidency of Somalia regarding Somalia's National Leadership Forum referred to the disputed territory as Gobollada Sool iyo Sanaag ee Soomaaliland (Somaliland's Sool and Sanaag regions). Somalia's National Leadership Forum was chaired by the President of Somalia Hassan Sheikh Mohamud, and attended by the Speaker of Parliament Mohamed Osman Jawari, Prime Minister Omar Abdirashid Ali Sharmarke, Presidents of South West, Galmudug, Hirshabelle, states of Somalia and the Vice President of Puntland state.

== See also ==
- Maakhir
- Khatumo State

== Notes ==
- H. J. de Blij, Peter O. Muller, Antoinette WinklerPrins, Jan Nijman, The World Today: Concepts and Regions in Geography, (John Wiley & Sons: 2010)
- Puntland Constitution
