= Mohamud Ali Magan =

Minister of Planning of Somalia
- In office 12 January 2015 – 21 March 2017
- Prime Minister: Omar Abdirashid Ali Sharmarke
- Succeeded by: Jamal Mohamed Hassan

Personal details
- Born: Kismaayo, Somalia
- Party: Independent

Mohamud Ali Magan is a Somali politician. He is a former Minister of Planning of Somalia, appointed to the position on 12 January 2015 by Prime Minister Omar Abdirashid Ali Sharmarke, and in March 2017 succeeded by Jamal Mohamed Hassan in the cabinet of Prime Minister Hassan Ali Khaire.
