= Enayati-ye Vasat =

Enayati-ye Vasat عنايتي وسط
- Village
- Location within Iran
- Coordinates: 30°39′26″N 48°42′20″E
- Country: Iran
- Province: Khuzestan
- County: Shadegan
- Bakhsh: Central
- Rural District: Abshar

Population (2006)
  - Total: 385
- Time zone: UTC+3:30 (IRST)
  - Summer (DST): UTC+4:30 (IRDT)

Enayati-ye Vasat (Persian: عنايتي وسط, also romanized as ʿEnāyatī-ye Vasaṭ) is a village in Abshar Rural District, in the Central District of Shadegan County, Khuzestan Province, Iran. At the 2006 census, its population was 385, in 45 families.
