= Nahr-e Gabin-e Olya =

Nahr-e Gabin-e Olya نهرگبين عليا
- Village
- Location within Iran
- Coordinates: 30°36′15″N 48°43′42″E
- Country: Iran
- Province: Khuzestan
- County: Shadegan
- Bakhsh: Central
- Rural District: Abshar

Population (2006)
  - Total: 79
- Time zone: UTC+3:30 (IRST)
  - Summer (DST): UTC+4:30 (IRDT)

Nahr-e Gabin-e Olya (Persian: نهرگبين عليا, also Romanized as Nahr-e Gabīn-e ‘Olyā; also known as Nahr-e Gabīn) is a village in Abshar Rural District, in the Central District of Shadegan County, Khuzestan Province, Iran. At the 2006 census, its population was 79, in 11 families.
