= Nahr-e Meseyyer =

Village in Khuzestan province, Iran

Nahr-e Meseyyer Persian: نهرمسير
- Village
- Location within Iran
- Coordinates: 30°39′03″N 48°41′24″E
- Country: Iran
- Province: Khuzestan
- County: Shadegan
- District: Central
- Rural District: Abshar

Population (2016)
  - Total: 3,917
- Time zone: UTC+3:30 (IRST)

Nahr-e Meseyyer (Persian: نهرمسير) (Note: Also known as Massīr, Meseyyer, Mosayyer, and Mosayyer-e Jonūbī) is a village in Abshar Rural District of the Central District of Shadegan County, Khuzestan province, Iran.

== Demographics ==
=== Population ===
At the time of the 2006 National Census, the village's population was 3,221 in 654 households. The following census in 2011 counted 3,922 people in 901 households. The 2016 census measured the population of the village as 3,917 people in 957 households. It was the most populous village in its rural district.
