= Yubeh, Iran =

Yubeh يوبه
- Village
- Location within Iran
- Coordinates: 30°40′29″N 48°41′42″E
- Country: Iran
- Province: Khuzestan
- County: Shadegan
- Bakhsh: Central
- Rural District: Abshar

Population (2006)
  - Total: 333
- Time zone: UTC+3:30 (IRST)
  - Summer (DST): UTC+4:30 (IRDT)

Yubeh (Persian: يوبه, also Romanized as Yūbeh; also known as Yūbeh Sa‘dī) is a village in Abshar Rural District, in the Central District of Shadegan County, Khuzestan Province, Iran. At the 2006 census, its population was 333, in 47 families.
