= Nahr-e Jadid =

Village in Khuzestan province, Iran

Nahr-e Jadid Persian: نهرجديد
- Village
- Location within Iran
- Coordinates: 30°38′27″N 48°44′08″E
- Country: Iran
- Province: Khuzestan
- County: Shadegan
- District: Central
- Rural District: Abshar

Population (2016)
  - Total: 1,435
- Time zone: UTC+3:30 (IRST)

Nahr-e Jadid (Persian: نهرجديد) (Note: Also romanized as Nahr-e Jadīd; also known as Ḩadbeh, Ḩazbeh, and Jadīd) is a village in, and the capital of, Abshar Rural District of the Central District of Shadegan County, Khuzestan province, Iran.

== Demographics ==
=== Population ===
At the time of the 2006 National Census, the village's population was 1,124 in 204 households. The following census in 2011 counted 1,615 people in 380 households. The 2016 census measured the population of the village as 1,435 people in 330 households.
