= Zakia Hussein =

Somalian politician

Zakiya Hussein Sakiya Xuseen زكية حسين
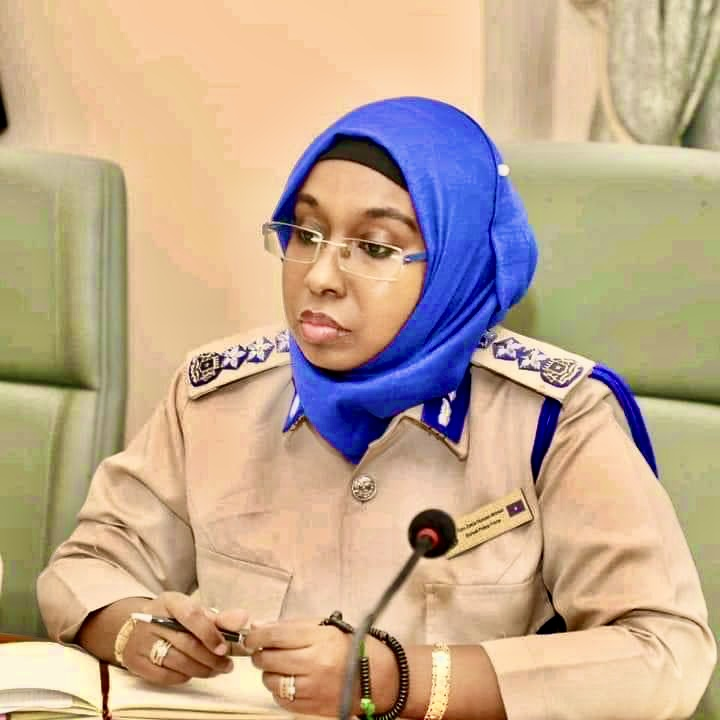
- Born: June 25 1984; Mogadishu, Somali Democratic Republic
- Title: Deputy Chief of Somali Police Force Former director of community policing at the Somali Police Force

Zakia Hussein (Somali: Sakiya Xuseen, Arabic: زكية حسين), also known as Zakia Hussein Ahmed, is a Somali politician who has made significant strides in the country's security forces, becoming a role model for women across Somalia. Zakia Hussein hails from the Surre sub-division of the wider Dir clan.

== Early life ==
Zakia Hussein was born on June 25,1984, in Mogadishu, Somalia. Her father Hussein Ahmed was a doctor who became the private physician of the then president of Somalia, Siyad Barre, while her mother served as a senior officer at the Somalia Bank of Commerce while studying for her master's degree in business management.

Hussein's family fled Somalia's civil war when she was six years old, eventually settling in Sweden. She spent most of her childhood and compulsory education in Sweden before moving to the United Kingdom at the age of 22.

== Career in the UK ==
Hussein studied international relations and diplomacy at London Metropolitan University, where she became involved in activism and advocacy, particularly for her native Somali community. While at university in London, Hussein became an active member of the Islamic Society and eventually became its vice-president, tackling Islamophobia at a time when it was rampant. She also joined the Hanoolaato movement, a diaspora-led sociopolitical organization that advocates for peace and development in Somalia. She joined the Anti Tribalism Movement and hosted Somali language talk show called the Hooyo Talkshow in Somalia London Radio. In addition, she joined Hanoolaato and became a prominent voice within the Somali community in London.

== Police career in Somalia ==
In 2012, Zakia Hussein relocated to Somalia and began working as a program manager at the Heritage Institute think-tank in Mogadishu. She soon joined the Somali Police Force as the director of community policing in 2014, becoming the first female to ever be appointed as a departmental director in the force. She also served as head of policy planning and in charge of designing and overseeing the implementation of the National Intelligence & Security Agency's intelligence and institutional reform policy.

During her tenure in the police force, Hussein survived two assassination attempts and faced deep-rooted sexism and condescension in the male-dominated institution. However, she persevered and in 2018, she was promoted to Brigadier General and appointed as the Deputy Police Commissioner, becoming the first female to reach both milestones in the history of Somalia's security forces. She continued to push for institutional reform and public-police relations, using her position to bring the public and the security agencies closer together. In 2021, she established the first all-female armed special forces unit in Somalia, further demonstrating her commitment to empowering women in the country.

== Challenges and achievements ==
Zakia Hussein worked to build public trust in the police force following allegations of abuse, corruption, rape, and exploitation. She has also fought deeply rooted stereotypes against women in Somalia, becoming a role model for women in the force and the entire female population of Somalia.

Zakia Hussein Ahmed has become a trailblazer for women in Somalia's security forces, breaking down barriers and advocating for institutional reform and public-police relations. Her dedication to serving her country has inspired many and cemented her place as a role model for women across Somalia.
