= Enayati-ye Pain =

Enayati-ye Pain عنايتي پائين
- Village
- Location within Iran
- Coordinates: 30°35′26″N 48°41′19″E
- Country: Iran
- Province: Khuzestan
- County: Shadegan
- Bakhsh: Central
- Rural District: Abshar

Population (2006)
  - Total: 750
- Time zone: UTC+3:30 (IRST)
  - Summer (DST): UTC+4:30 (IRDT)

Enayati-ye Pain (Persian: عنايتي پائين, also Romanized as ʿEnāyatī-ye Pā’īn and ʿEnāyatī-ye Pāeen) is a village in Abshar Rural District, in the Central District of Shadegan County, Khuzestan Province, Iran. At the 2006 census, its population was 750, in 135 families.
