= Ministry of Health (Puntland) =

Puntland government ministry responsible for Health

- Wasaaradda Caafimaadka ee Dawladda Puntland وزارة الصحة في بونتلاند

Agency overview
- Formed: 23 August 1998
- Jurisdiction: Government of Puntland
- Headquarters: Garowe, Puntland
- Minister responsible: Said Qorshel
- Website: https://moh.pl.so/

The Puntland Ministry of Health MoH (Somali: Wasaaradda Caafimaadka ee Dawladda Puntland; Arabic: وزارة الصحة في بونتلاند) is a governmental body responsible for developing and implementing health policy, monitoring and regulating the health sector, and protecting and enhancing private and public health to drive the advancement of the state's vision for a dynamic, healthy lifestyle that serves as the state's foundation for overall health development. The department was ministered by Said Qorshel.

== Establishment ==
Following the formation of the autonomous State of Puntland, the Ministry of Health was re-established in 2001.

The ministry serves to support the Puntland citizenry in attaining better health, improving health outcomes, and providing quality health services to all nine regions (Bari, Ceyn, Haylan, Karkaar, Mudug, Nugal, Ras Aseir, Sanaag and Sool).

=== The ministry’s policy ===
- Scaling up of essential and basic health and nutrition services (EPHS)
- Overcoming the crisis of human resources for health
- Improving governance and leadership of the health system
- Enhancing access to essential medicines and technologies
- Providing a functioning health information system
- Health financing for progress towards Universal Health Coverage (UHC)
- Improving health sector physical infrastructure
- Enhancing health emergency preparedness and response
- Promoting action on social determinants of health and health in all policies

=== The ministry structures and departments ===
Department of Human Resources

Department of Admin and Finance

Department of Planning, Policy and Development

Department of Public Health

Department of Primary Health Care

Department of Medical Health Services

Each department has subprograms with well-trained and qualified program managers and staff.

The ministry operates regional and district health offices to ensure that the population is covered at every level.

The ministry interacts with multiple international organizations, including UNICEF, WHO, UNFPA, IOM, WFP, World Bank, Save the Children, World Vision International, MSF, Tadamun Social Society, Care International and the Somali Red Crescent Society, who have contributed to the development and strengthening of the ministry health sectors.

== List of Ministers ==
- Sadiq Enow
- Said Qorshel
