= Nahr-e Rahmeh =

Nahr-e Rahmeh نهررحمه
- Village
- Location within Iran
- Coordinates: 30°35′56″N 48°42′47″E
- Country: Iran
- Province: Khuzestan
- County: Shadegan
- Bakhsh: Central
- Rural District: Abshar

Population (2006)
  - Total: 481
- Time zone: UTC+3:30 (IRST)
  - Summer (DST): UTC+4:30 (IRDT)

Nahr-e Rahmeh (Persian: نهررحمه, also Romanized as Nahr-e Raḩmeh) is a village in Abshar Rural District, in the Central District of Shadegan County, Khuzestan Province, Iran. At the 2006 census, its population was 481, in 103 families.
