= Ministry of Planning and International Cooperation (Somalia) =

Government ministry of Somalia

Coordinates: 2°2′24″N 45°20′46″E

Ministry of Planning, Investment and Economic Development
- Wasaaradda Qorsheynta, Maalgashiga iyo Horumarinta Dhaqaalaha
- Emblem of the Ministry of Planning, Investment and Economic Development

Ministry overview
- Formed: 1960 (66 years ago)
- Preceding Ministry: Department of Foreign Affairs
- Jurisdiction: Somalia
- Headquarters: Mogadishu (Somalia)
- Ministry executive: H.E Mohamud A. Sheikh Farah (Beenebeene), Minister
- Parent Ministry: Cabinet of Somalia
- Website: www.mop.gov.so

The Ministry of Planning, Investment and Economic Development (MoPIED) (Somali: Wasaaradda Qorsheynta, Maalgashiga iyo Horumarinta Dhaqaalaha) is a government institution responsible for informing the country’s socio-economic vision and turning it into practical policy actions in order to support macroeconomic stability and sustainable growth in Somalia. The current Minister is H.E Mohamud A. Sheikh Farah (Beenebeene).

Ministry consists of four parts; the General Directorate of Planning, the National Institute of Statistics, International Cooperation, and Monitaring and Evaluation.

== List of planning ministries ==
- Ahmed Ismail Abdi (Duqsi)
- Ahmed Mohamed Mohamoud
- Michael Mariano
- Abdillahi Mohammed Ahmed
- Hawadle Madar
- Abdirahman Abdishakur Warsame
- Mohamud Hassan Suleiman
- Said Abdullahi Deni
- Abdirahman Yusuf Hussein Aynte
- Mohamud Ali Magan
- Gamal Mohamed Hassan

== See also ==
- Census
- Demographics
