= Haylan region =

Haylan Gobolka Haylaan
- Gobolka
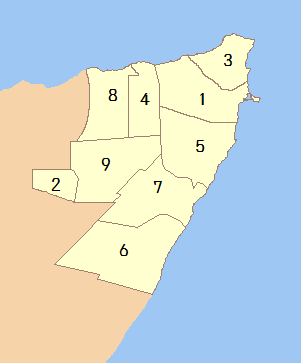
- Haylan is number 4. Area 2, 4, 8, and 9 are disputed with Somaliland.
- Country: Puntland (Disputed with Somaliland)
- Capital: Dhahar
- Time zone: UTC+3 (EAT)

Haylan region (Somali: Gobolka Haylaan) is the area claimed, but Partially Controlled by Puntland and established in 2003. In Somalia and Somaliland, it is designated as an eastern part of the Sanaag region. It is a disputed area with Somaliland.

== Towns and Villages ==
- Dhahar - Capital.
- Buraan
- Hingalol
- El Ayo
- Haylan

== Governor ==
Governor of the Haylan region (Gudoomiyaha Gobalka Haylaan) is as follows:

Maxamed Faarax Ciise (Jeentallo, Jeentalo)

In February 2012, when the Education Minister of Puntland visited Dhahar, Maxamed Faarax welcomed him as governor of Haylan region.
In July 2016, Fighting broke out between Somaliland and Puntland troops between Dhahar and Hingalol; according to Jeentallo, Somaliland troops entered the area to register for elections.

Maxamed Cawil Cabdullahi

In January 2017, Mohammed Awil Abdullahi, governor of the Haylan region, initiated a feeding project for displaced people in the Dhahar district with WFP.

Siciid Xuseen Maxamuud Irbad

In July 2019, Puntland President Said Abdullahi Dani appointed Said Hussein Mahamud as governor of the Haylan region.

== History ==
On December 4, 2003, the Puntland government announced that it had established three regions: Bender Qassim, Karkaar, and Haylan.

In October 2019, the Puntland government claimed that it was illegal for Somalia's Minister of Planning to open an office in Dhahar, the capital of Haylan region.

In August 2021, Haylan football team won putland regional cup.

== See also ==
- Administrative divisions of Somalia
- Administrative divisions of Somaliland
