= BUH =

BUH is the IATA airport code for either of the two airports of Bucharest, Romania:

- Henri Coandă International Airport, in Otopeni
- Aurel Vlaicu International Airport, in Băneasa

== See also ==
- Buh (disambiguation)
