= Hadaftimo =

Hadaftimo Hadaaftimo
- Town
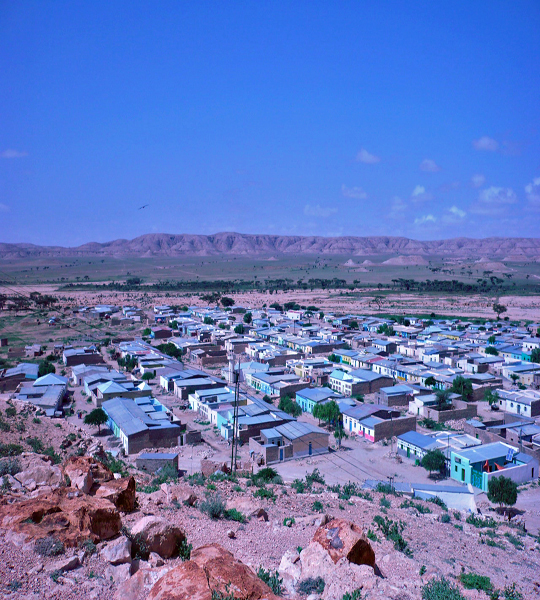

- Location. Hadaftimo (Somaliland) Hadaftimo (Somalia)
- Coordinates: 10°46′00″N 48°06′00″E
- Country: Somalia
- Region: Sanaag
- District: Erigavo

Government
  - Mayor: Mohamed Abdi Mahamed (Arnab)

Area
  - Total: 5 km^{2} (1.9 sq mi)

Population (2021)
  - Total: 36,000
- Time zone: UTC+3 (EAT)
- Area code: +252

Hadaftimo (Somali: Hadaaftimo) is a historic town in the eastern Sanaag region of Somalia. It is home to several archaeological sites and ancient buildings. There is a Puntland military base.

== History ==
Hadaftimo is an old town. During the British Somaliland, four settlements were identified in the vicinity: Buraan in the Sool Plateau, El Dahir, Xubeera, Hadaftimo in the Gebi Valley.

Around 1990, the Somali National Movement attacked Hadaftimo, a home of the Warsangeli clan, causing a large number of refugees. However, this attack was later condemned by Somali National Movement leaders.

In mid-1992, an Islamist militant group Al-Itihaad al-Islamiya (AIAI) moved into the Sanaag region, and the Warsangali and dishiishe clan held a meeting in Hadaftimo and resolved to unify Somalia and prevent the AIAI from entering.

According to a report in 1993, Hadaftimo had a population of 4,000 and only one source of drinking water. There are six elementary schools with a total of 260 students. Hadaftimo along with Erigavo, Badhan, Dhahar, El Afweyn, Las Khorey, Garadag and Maydh are listed as major population centers of Earstern Sanaag.

Around 2005, Horn relief implemented projects such as gully and sheet erosion control in 10 villages of Sool plateau and Gebi valley in Sanaag region.

In November 2012, Puntland troops built a base in Beraagaha near Hingalol and advanced to the village of Ceel cad, west of Hadaftimo, to confront Somaliland stationed in Yubbe.

In May 2015, the Somaliland government launched a water supply project in Hadaftimo. It announced it would install a new well and water supply system.

In August 2017, voter registration for Somaliland's presidential election and distribution of ballot boxes in Hadafutimo, August 2017.

In October 2017, the Puntland government began construction of a new police station building in Hadaftimo.

In November 2017, a delegation led by Puntland's Minister of Security arrived in Hadaaftimo to survey the situation in the Somaliland elections. The next day, Puntland troops were dispatched from Bosaso to prevent the ballot boxes from being brought in for the Somaliland presidential election. The next day, a demonstration was held in Hadaftimo against the Somaliland elections.

In June 2019, the Somaliland army deployed armored vehicles in Sool and Sanaag regions, including Hadaftimo. In August, a battle broke out between the Somaliland and Puntland armies in Hadaftimo. It was the first full-scale battle in about two years.

On February 26, 2020, Somalilanders and Puntlanders forces clashed near Hadaaftimo. The Somaliland government announced that the Somaliland army had won the battle.

On June 8, 2020, Puntland security forces opened fire on a demonstration by residents in Hadaaftimo in support of the federal government.

In November 2021, Somaliland troops from Yubbe attacked Hadaaftimo in Puntland.

In May 2023, the President of the Puntland Parliament visited Hadaftimo and was welcomed.

== Notes ==
- Hadaaftimo, Somalia
