= Enayati-ye Bala =

Enayati-ye Bala عنايتي بالا
- Village
- Location within Iran
- Coordinates: 30°37′40″N 48°41′20″E
- Country: Iran
- Province: Khuzestan
- County: Shadegan
- Bakhsh: Central
- Rural District: Abshar

Population (2006)
  - Total: 433
- Time zone: UTC+3:30 (IRST)
  - Summer (DST): UTC+4:30 (IRDT)

Enayati-ye Bala (Persian: عنايتي بالا, also Romanized as ʿEnāyatī-ye Bālā) is a village in Abshar Rural District, in the Central District of Shadegan County, Khuzestan Province, Iran. At the 2006 census, its population was 433, in 65 families.
