= El Buh =

Elbuh Ceel Buux
- Town
- Ceelbuh
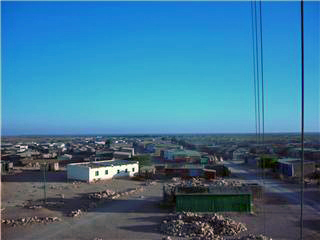
- Overview of the town.

- Location in Somaliland Elbuh (Somalia)
- Coordinates: 10°13′N 48°17′E
- Country: Somalia
- Region: Sanaag
- District: Badhan

Government
  - Mayor: Ahmed Ali Salaad

Population (2007)
  - Total: 1,800
- Time zone: UTC+3 (EAT)

El Buh (Somali: Ceelbuh) is a town in the Northeastern state of Somaliland.

El Buh is located in the Badhan District. The town was briefly a part of the Maakhir administration in the late 2000s which mainly covered Badhan District area's, until it was officially incorporated into the Somalia authority since 1960.

In May 2019, The Somalia Justice Minister visits El Buh. Residents welcome him.

In February 2020, Puntland's military procurement and medical teams has been deployed to the El Buh military base.

In January 2025, Suldan Said Suldan Abdisalan of Warsangali held a Warsangali clan meeting in El Buh.
