= Badhan District =

District in Sanaag, Somaliland

Badhan District Degmada Badhan
- Coordinates: 10°43′N 48°20′E
- Country: Somaliland
- Region: Sanaag
- Capital: Badhan

Population (2005)
  - Total: 55,000
- Time zone: UTC+3 (EAT)
- Area code: 2km²

Badhan District (Somali: Degmada Badhan) is a district located in the Sanaag country of Somalia. Its capital is Badhan.

== Demographics ==
The district is mainly populated by the Warsangali sub-division of the Harti Darod with a minority of the Abbas Muse sub-division of the Surre Dir.

== Timelines ==
In 2005, a drought occurred in the Sanaag region, particularly affecting the Badhan district.

In 2010 Somaliland presidential election, Badhan district received 734 votes for UDUB, 126 for KULMIYE, and 965 for UCID, totaling 1,825. The total number of votes cast throughout Somaliland was 1,069,914.

In December 2013, one of the presidential candidates for the Puntland presidential election visited Badhan district. The candidate criticized the current Puntland government for doing nothing in Sanaag district.

In May 2015, the Ministry of Water Resources of Somaliland started a water supply project in Hadaftimo, Badhan district.

In October 2015, the chairpersons of the Somaliland Electoral Commission and others were detained by Puntland in Badhan district but were released shortly after.

In August 2017, voter cards for the Somaliland presidential election were distributed in the Sanaag region only in the Badhan district; no registration took place in the Las Korey and Dahar districts.

In October 2017, the Badhan district experienced a significant drought.

In August 2018, President Puntland dissolved the Badhan Parliament.

In September 2018, a delegation led by President Puntland visited Badhan District. Somaliland government considers the Sanaag region, including Badhan district, to be Somaliland territory and viewed the visit of President Puntland as an invasion.

In March 2019, the Badhan executive branch in Somaliland hosted several soldiers who had fled from Somaliland rebels.

In May 2019, Somaliland Governor Badhan and others resigned and defected to Puntland. The Somaliland army first commented on the matter in August, stating that "Somaliland soldiers from Badhan district defected to Puntland, but they refused to give them orders from the army even though they were paid their salaries, and we are rather grateful that they left." The soldiers who have defected since May are estimated to be about 1,000.

In September 2019, the Puntland government appointed an official for Badhan district. A woman was elected as deputy governor.

In October 2019, Somaliland military units stationed in Badhan district defected to Puntland.

In January 2020, the Minister of Interior of Puntland appointed Abdirahman Yusuf Ahmed as governor of Badhan District.

In February 2020, Somaliland forces in Yubbe attacked Puntland forces in Hadaftimo, resulting in fighting.

In June 2020, a gunfight between Puntland forces took place at Badhan airport.

In October 2020, Puntland's Ministry of Interior appointed five new members to the Badhan parliament, bringing the total to 33. protests were held in Badhan.

In October 2020, Puntland soldiers, including some who defected from Somaliland in May 2019, defected to Somaliland.

In January 2021, the Speaker of the House of Representatives Puntland visited Badhan. At this time, Puntland was leading a partial force, which disbanded and replaced Badhan's police force. This wiped out all traces of Somaliland.

In March 2021, a Puntland Member of Parliament representing the Dhahar district was killed in a car accident while driving from Badhan to Mindigale.

In March 2021, the Puntland Army conducted military training in the Badhan district.

In March 2021, Puntland announced it would start collecting taxes in the Badhan district from March 15. It also banned the passage of vehicles not bearing Puntland numbers in the Sanaag region.

In November 2021, Puntland broke ground on a new prison in the Badhan district.

In January 2022, the 13th Badhan Congress adjourned at the direction of the Puntland Ministry of Interior.

In October 2022, a young worker slipped and became trapped in a mine in Milho, Badhan district.

In May 2023, local election in Badhan and the Kaah party, to which President Puntland belongs, won.

In August 2023, the seven political parties of Puntland met and agreed to establish the Badhan administrative district in the Sanaag region on August 30, 2023. The founding ceremony was attended by Speaker of the House of Representatives Puntland and others.

== See also ==
- Administrative divisions of Somaliland
- Regions of Somaliland
- Districts of Somaliland
- Somalia–Somaliland border
