= Jibrell Ali Salad =

Somali politician

Jibrell Ali Salaad
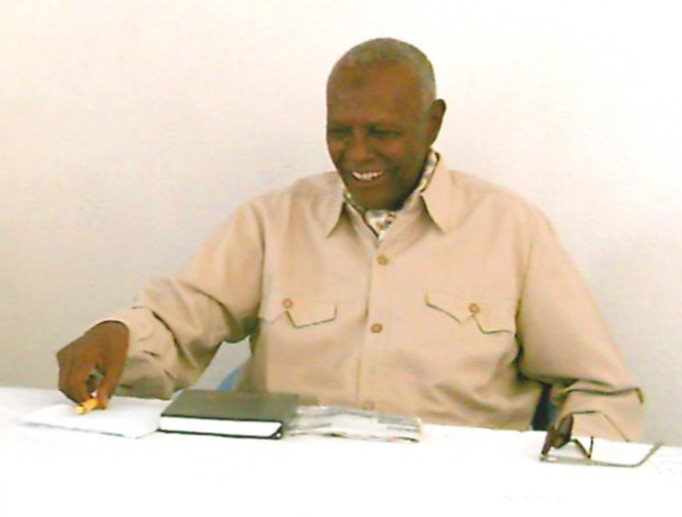

President of Maakhir State
- In office 2007–2009
- Succeeded by: Abdullahi Ahmed Jama

Personal details
- Born: 1939 Las Khorey, British Somaliland
- Education: University of Hargeisa

Jibrell Ali Salaad (Somali: Jibriil Cali Salaad) is a Somali general and politician. He was president of the Maakhir proto-state formed in 2007.

Salad was born 1939 in Laasqoray in Sanaag, British Somaliland. His full name is Jibrell Ali Salaad Aadan Garad Awl. He is a member of the Warsangeli Royal family, one of the oldest royal dynasties in Somalia which dates back to the 13th century.

== Education ==
President Salad studied at Ahmed Gurey School in Hargeisa from 1952 until 1957, and later in 2000 he graduated at University of Hargeisa and got a degree in law.

== Military career ==
Jibrell joined the army in 1958 and served in the Somaliland Scouts, the British Army's military force in the region. After Somalia's independence in 1960 from Britain and Italy he became an officer in the newly formed Somali National Army. Four years later, Jibrell fought against Ethiopia during border raids caused by border disputes between the countries (which occurred from 1960 to 1964), in which he was wounded.

From 1971 to 1976 he studied in the Soviet Union at the Soviet military academies studying artillery from 1971 to 1975, and Air Defense Systems in 1976.

With the outbreak of the Second Ogaden war with Ethiopia in 1977, Jibrell suffered another gunshot wound, received a medal of Honour and was promoted up the ranks to Colonel.

== Maakhir State ==
Salad travelled through areas of Puntland and Somaliland to obtain support for the creation of the Maakhir State of Somalia from the Badhan district of Sanaag and part of Bari

As of 1 July 2007 Salad was proclaimed the "Commander in Chief" of the new state.
