= Yubbe =

Town in Sanaag, Somalia

- Town
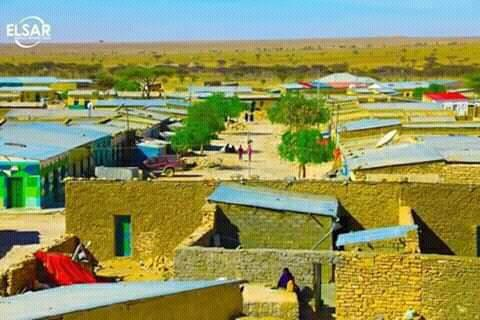
- Motto

- Location in Sanaag Yubbe (Somalia)
- Coordinates: 10°44′51″N 47°55′09″E
- Country: Somalia/Somalia
- Region: Sanaag
- District: Erigavo

Population (2002)
  - Total: 2,000
- Time zone: UTC+3 (EAT)

Yubbe (also known as Yobe, Yube, Yubeh and Yubbe Tug) is a town in the Sanaag region in NORTHEASTERN STATE OF SOMALIA.Somalia claim sovereignty over the area. In January 2023, it has been reported that Somaliland forces withdrew from the town. And according to reports in August 2025, the Puntland government has incorporated the Yube clan militia into its own forces as part of Operation Cal Madow.

== History ==
=== Archaeology ===
A desert town mostly inhabited by nomads, Yubbe is home to numerous old archaeological structures. While visiting the locality in the 19th century, the British explorer John Hanning Speke described having seen various tumuli. Of these, he reported that one contained "a hollow compartment propped up by beams of timber, at the bottom of which, buried in the ground, were several earthenware pots, some leaden coins, a ring of gold such as the Indian Mussulman women wear in their noses, and various other miscellaneous property."

=== Somali Civil War ===
Relation map. Y=Yubbe, H=Hadaftimo, B=Badhan.

On June 18, 1991, just after the start of the Somali civil war, an inter-clan meeting was held in Yubbe at the call from Warsangali clan chief Aaqil Bashir to Habar Yoonis clan chief Warsame Hersi (Yubbe 1). At the meeting, a resolution was passed to end hostilities and share grazing land. The October 6–9 rally (Yubbe 2) resulted in a ceasefire and boundary agreement between the Warsangali and Habar Yoonis clans.

In June 1993, a meeting of the Warsangari in Hadaftimo and Habar Yoonis clans was held in Yubbe (Yubbe 3), and it was resolved that the Habar Yoonis clan would hold a meeting in Erigavo to which all clan assemblies of the Sanag, including the rival Habr Je'lo and Dhulbahante clans, would be invited.

In 2006, a severe water shortage hit Sanag, and a well in the village of Yubbe was found to be failing due to the sever water shortage.

=== Puntland–Somaliland dispute ===
In 2007, the conflict between Puntland and Somaliland sharpened when the Somaliland army took advantage of internal conflicts within Puntland to occupy Las Anod (Puntland–Somaliland dispute.)

In October 2015, the chairman of the Somaliland Election Commission in Sanaag region was abducted in Yubbe and taken to Puntland-controlled Badhan.

In March 2019, Somaliland troops blocked traffic between Yubbe and Hadaftimo. Local residents demonstrated against the Somaliland army's advance. The elders of Erigavo met secretly to demand the withdrawal of the Somaliland army from Yubbe.

In August 2019, the Puntland-appointed governor of the Sanaag region announced that "the Somaliland army has withdrawn from the Sanaag region, with the exception of Yubbe, and the militias on the Puntland side have been nationalized."

In November 2019, residents of Yubbe witnessed a group of al-Shabaab members in the neighborhood Ga'an-Marodi.

In February 2020, Somaliland troops from Yubbe fought Puntland troops in Kadhada village, 18 kilometers away. After the battle, Puntland forces claimed victory over Somaliland forces, capturing prisoners and military vehicles.

In March 2021, the Somaliland-appointed governor of the Sanaag region, who lives in Erigavo, called on the residents of Yubbe to cooperate with him, as a planned maternity hospital and other development projects in Yubbe have been suspended.

In January 2023, Somaliland army withdraws from Yubbe.

In April 2024, Somaliland’s Minister of Transport and Road Development laid the cornerstone for the road connecting Yubbe and Erigavo in Erigavo, urging the residents of Yubbe to participate in the road construction and provide the necessary funding.

In August 2025, the Puntland government has reportedly incorporated the Yubbe clan militia into its own forces as part of Operation Cal Madow.

== Demographics ==
The town is inhabited by the Mahmoud Harti clans of Nuh Omar(Warsangeli) and Hinjiye(Mahmoud Harti) .

== See also ==
- Amud
- Heis
- El Ayo
- Damo
- Mosylon
- Opone
- Gelweita
