= Sayidomar Aden Guled =

Puntland politician

Sayidomar Aden Guled H.E

State minister of State minister of health of the Puntland Government
- Incumbent
- Assumed office 17 February 2016

Sayidomar Aden Guled (Somali: Sayidcumar Aadan Guuleed, Arabic: سيدعمر ءادم غوليد) is a Puntland politician who served as the State Minister of Health of the Puntland government and was sworn in on 17 February 2016.
