= El Danane =

- Town
- Location in Somalia.
- Coordinates: 6°35′00″N 49°08′00″E
- Country: Somalia
- Region: Mudug
- Time zone: UTC+3 (EAT)

El Danane (Somali: Ceel Dhanaane, Arabic: عيل دنانه) is a town in the north-central Mudug region of Somalia.
