= Galhagoog =

Town in Mudug, Somalia

- Town
- Location in Somalia.
- Coordinates: 6°18′0″N 49°4′0″E
- Country: Somalia: Galmudug
- Region: Mudug
- District: Hobyo
- Time zone: UTC+3 (EAT)

Galhagoog is a town in the north-central Mudug region of Somalia.
