= Buh Gujran =

Buh Gujran Booh Gujran
- Village
- Location in Punjab, India Buh Gujran (India)
- Coordinates: 31.0764191°N 75.0804607°E
- Country: India
- State: Punjab
- District: Firozpur
- Tehsil: Zira
- Elevation: 212 m (696 ft)

Population (2011)
  - Total: 622
- Time zone: UTC+5:30 (IST)
- 2011 census code: 34225

Buh Gujran is a village in the Firozpur district of Punjab, India. It is located in the Zira tehsil.

== Demographics ==
According to the 2011 census of India, Buh Gujran has 105 households. The effective literacy rate (i.e. the literacy rate of population excluding children aged 6 and below) is 66.36%.

Demographics (2011 Census)
	Total	Male	Female
Population	622	316	306
Children aged below 6 years	72	36	36
Scheduled caste	295	148	147
Scheduled tribe	0	0	0
Literates	365	195	170
Workers (all)	243	182	61
Main workers (total)	224	174	50
Main workers: Cultivators	92	88	4
Main workers: Agricultural labourers	91	52	39
Main workers: Household industry workers	0	0	0
Main workers: Other	41	34	7
Marginal workers (total)	19	8	11
Marginal workers: Cultivators	2	2	0
Marginal workers: Agricultural labourers	9	4	5
Marginal workers: Household industry workers	1	0	1
Marginal workers: Others	7	2	5
Non-workers	379	134	245
