= El Dahir =

El Dahir Maakhir
- Town
- Location in Somalia
- Coordinates: 10°37′47″N 49°02′0″E
- Country: Somalia
- Region: Puntland
- Time zone: UTC+3 (East Africa Time)

El Dahir (Somali: Ceel-Daahir) formerly known as El Dofar (Somali: Ceel Doofaar), is a town in Bari, Somalia region of Puntland state of Somalia.

It often floods during the rainy season because it is the confluence of the wadi from Buraan and from Durdur.

== History ==
A book about British Somaliland published in England in 1951 mentions it under the name "El Dofar".

In April 2020, a stimulant plant Khat was seized in El Dahir and incinerated in the public square. Soldiers who participated in the trafficking were brought to trial, but civilians were only seized and not arrested.

In August 2021, the Puntland government announced the construction of a 3,600 cubic meter dam located 2 km northeast from El Dahir.

== El Dahir - Erigavo road ==
Relation map. Ba=Badhan, H=Hadaftimo, Ed=El Dahir, Eg=Erigavo, Bu=Buraan

Development on an asphalt road that connects the city to the regional capital, Ergavo is currently underway.

This road is 368 km long, it is very important road to puntland and the region it will boost commercial activity and it also connects Puntland main regions Bari and Sanaag.

However, Erigavo is a town that has been under stable and effective control by Somaliland since the beginning of Somaliland's independence, and the Puntland government's control extends only to the vicinity of Hadaftimo. Puntland's main media outlet Garowe Online reports that the "El Dahir - Badhan road."

=== Construction ===
This project began on January 10, 2016.

In August 2017, the El Dahir-Erigavo Road Commission completed 45 kilometers of work. The chairman of the committee at this time is Sheikh Cali Maxamuud Xasan. Estimated cost so far is $16 million.

On January 11, 2018, President Farmajo of the Federal Republic of Somalia visited El Dahir and laid the cornerstone of the road. However, Puntland's President Gaas criticized this, claiming that the Somali Federal Government did not play its role about the loss by force of Tukaraq.

In July 2018, the El Dahir-Eligavo Road Commission reported to President Gaas of Puntland that the first phase of the 90-kilometer road had been completed and that a second phase of paving with sand and mortar was planned. The 90 kilometers from El Dahir is equivalent to the distance to Badhan.

In November 2018, the Federal Government of Somalia announced that it will provide $1.5 million for the construction of the El Dahir-Erigavo road.

In October 2019, the news website Somaliland Standard reported that "the 90-kilometer road between El Dahir and Badhan is in very good condition.

In August 2020, construction began on the second phase of the road connecting El Dahir and Erigavo. In October, the Puntland council provided 200 barrels of tar. The project was suspended and resumed in December. In January 2021, a ceremony was held at the Puntland Presidential Palace to celebrate the tar donation campaign for the second phase of the project.
