= Buh, Kapurthala =

Buh
- Village
- Location in Punjab, India Buh (India)
- Coordinates: 31.179574°N 74.903339°E
- Country: India
- State: Punjab
- District: Kapurthala

Government
  - Type: Panchayati raj (India)
  - Body: Gram panchayat

Population (2011)
  - Total: 1,526
- Sex ratio 784/742♂/♀

Languages
  - Official: Punjabi
  - Other spoken: Hindi
- Time zone: UTC+5:30 (IST)
- PIN: 144601
- Telephone code: 01822
- ISO 3166 code: IN-PB
- Vehicle registration: PB-09
- Website: kapurthala.gov.in

Buh is a village in Kapurthala district of Punjab State, India. It is located 17 kilometres (11 mi) from Kapurthala, which is both district and sub-district headquarters of Buh. The village is administrated by a Sarpanch, who is an elected representative.

== Demography ==
According to the report published by Census India in 2011, Buh has a total number of 281 houses and population of 1,526 of which include 784 males and 742 females. Literacy rate of Buh is 72.13%, lower than state average of 75.84%. The population of children under the age of 6 years is 191 which is 12.52% of total population of Buh, and child sex ratio is approximately 736, lower than state average of 846.

== Population data ==
Particulars	Total	Male	Female
Total No. of Houses	281	-	-
Population	1,526	784	742
Child (0–6)	191	110	81
Schedule Caste	882	449	433
Schedule Tribe	0	0	0
Literacy	72.13 %	77.15 %	67.02 %
Total Workers	514	462	52
Main Worker	505	0	0
Marginal Worker	9	5	4

== Air travel connectivity ==
The closest airport to the village is Sri Guru Ram Dass Jee International Airport.
