= Maakhir =

Former Somali sultanate in eastern Somalia

Maakhir State of Somalia ولاية ماخر الصومال Location of Maakhir (green) in the Horn of Africa
- 2007–2009
- Flag Coat of arms
- Motto: Diinta, Saldanada iyo Somalinimo ayaan isu sadqaynaynaa! (Somali); We sacrifice ourselves for religion, sovereignty, and Somaliness!
- Anthem: Saldanada Saatirkeen saraysii abidkeed (Somali); May the Sultanate be elevated forever
- Capital: Badhan
- Common languages: Somali
- Demonym: Makhiri
- History
  - Declared: 26 May 2007
  - Disestablished: 2009
- Currency: Somali shilling
- Calling code: 252
- Internet TLD: .so
Succeeded by
North Eastern State of Somalia
- Today part of: Somalia

Makhir (Somali: Maakhir, Arabic: ماخر Mākhir) is described as referring to "the people on the coast," a term associated with the northern Somali coastal inhabitants, including the Warsangali clan. It has also been used as a designation for a Warsangali Sultanate that existed for centuries and continued to play an important role into the early twentieth century. Since then, Maakhir has frequently been used as the name for an organization primarily composed of Warsangeli clan.

Maakhir State of Somalia (Somali: Maamul Goboleedka Maakhir) was a short-lived quasi-state in the Sanaag region of eastern Somalia formed in 2007. It ended in 2009

From February 23 to March 11, 2025, a consultative conference on the self-determination of the Maakhir region was held in Badhan. Representatives were elected for an interim Maakhir administration.

== History ==
Maakhir refers to the area historically governed by the Warsangali Sultanate, which existed for centuries and played a significant role in the early 20th century. Maakhir is the only Somali territory to never be ruled by a foreign power. Until 1949, the northern region of Somalia (including Maakhir, which was fully autonomous) was known to the Western world as British Somaliland.

=== Maakhir State of Somalia ===
Maakhir State was a short-lived quasi-state in the Sanaag region of eastern Somalia formed in 2007.

On 1 July 2007, a Warsangali sub-clan controlling the disputed area in eastern Sanaag proclaimed the semi-autonomous state of Maakhir. The first self-declared president was Jibrell Ali Salad.

Later, an opinion piece published on AllAfrica described Makhir State—alongside entities such as Awdal State—as a self-proclaimed federal “mini-state” that was generally established peacefully and did not spark inter-clan fighting.

According to Marchal, a CNRS Junior Professor of Center for International Studies (CERI), Maakhir had problems surviving as a state. While economically, it had the opportunity to use oil revenue from the region, there was no easy way to do this. Its main challenges were that it was small and not well organised. Given the economic and military realities, Maakhir had to seek compromise with either of its two neighbors, Puntland and Somaliland.

The Makhir state ended in 2009.

=== Aftermath ===
In February 2011, an opinion article on Hiiraan Online argued that clan-based federalism in west Puntland risked further fragmentation, citing the emergence of sub-sub-clan initiatives for their own federal states, including Maakhir State and Northland State.

In December 2012, a meeting was held in Cape Town, South Africa, by the Maakhir State diaspora, where participants discussed development in the Maakhir areas.

In November 2017, the Somali news outlet Hiiraan Online reported that eastern parts of Somaliland had not participated in the territory’s presidential election, referring to the regions as Khatumo and Makhir.

In December 2019, Somaliland opposition leader Faysal Ali Warabe (UCID) criticized that Abdihakim Abdullahi Haji Omar—who had stepped down earlier in 2019 as Puntland’s vice president—was leading a campaign to establish a Somalia's federal member state called Maakhir in Somaliland’s Sool and Sanaag regions.

=== Maakhir and Northeastern State of Somalia ===
In August 2023, after SSC-Khatumo forces captured the Goojacade military base near Las Anod and Somaliland forces retreated, SSC-Khatumo moved away from Somaliland and sought to the place under Somalia's federal framework. However, Somalia's Federal Government suggested for the integration of SSC-Khatumo with the Warsangeli, citing the requirement that a federal member state must comprise at least two regions.

At that time, interviews conducted in Badhan indicate that many Warsangeli support Puntland, while some (mostly young people and some politicians) support Maakhir, and others support SSC-Khatumo.

In October 2024, a brief clash was reported in Badhan between Puntland forces and troops from Maakhir State.

In March 2025, a conference held in Badhan under the Maakhir banner did not attract broad participation from across the Warsangeli clan.

In early July 2025, Puntland authorities attempted to strip Abdirashid Yusuf Jibril, a Warsangeli politician and former Speaker of the Puntland Parliament, of his parliamentary immunity and prosecute him, accusing him of using a political rally in El Buh to bring Sanaag closer to the SSC-Khatumo.

On 13 July 2025, a "high-level conference" aimed at finalising the formation of SSC-Khatumo began in Las Anod. A delegation from the Warsangeli also attended.By late July 2025, delegates representing the Khatumo and Makhir regions agreed to establish the Northeastern State (NES) as Somalia's sixth federal member state, with a seat allocation of 45 seats for SSC-Khatumo and 38 seats for Makhir. But the Warsangeli traditional leadership questioned the delegation's representativeness.
