= Tawfiiq District =

Towfiiq, Mudug, Puntland

Tawfiiq
- District
- Country: Somalia: Puntland
- Region: Mudug
- Capital: Tawfiiq
- Time zone: UTC+3 (EAT)

Tawfiiq District is a district in the north-central Mudug region of Puntland state. Its capital lies at Tawfiiq.
