= Bacadweyne =

Town in Mudug, Somalia

Bacadweyne is a city located in the municipality of Bacadweyne district in the Mudug region of Somalia Bacadweyne is an ancient city well known for Islamic education, business and the production of salt. The natural salt from the Bacadweyne municipality is sold throughout Somalia and Ethiopia. There are also fertile lush lands in certain townships governed by the municipality of Bacadweyne. Those green zones are utilized by farmers, cattle herders, and camel herders. The camel from Bacadweyne have been transported to Saudi Arabia through the Indho Deero Companies for over twenty years.

Degmada Bacaadweyne hada waa xor 01012026day

== Developments ==
Bacadweyne is continually developing. Bacadweyne City has a middle school, secondary school, 16 Quran memorization institutes, police station, and a prison.

There is construction taking place to complete the downtown area of the city, the Bacadweyne Local Hospital, and the Bacadweyne Technical Institute.

Bacadweyne Airport has been completed and is in use.
