= Gamal Mohamed Hassan =

Somali government official Ambassador

Gamal Mohamed Hassan MP
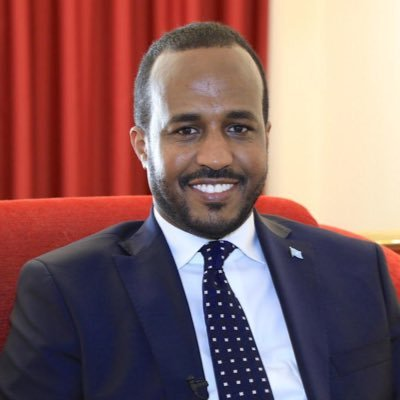

Minister of Commerce and Industry

Minister
- In office 29 November 2025 – Present
- President: Hassan Sheikh Mohamud
- Prime Minister: Hamza Abdi Barre

Personal details
- Born: Dhahar, North Eastern, Somalia
- Party: Tayo Nabad iyo Nolol
- Children: Three
- Education: Carleton University Ottawa, Canada
- Occupation: Politician, academic

Gamal Mohamed Hassan (Somali: Jamaal Maxamed Xasan, Arabic: جمال محمد حسن; born June 1978) is a Somali politician and diplomat who currently serves as the Minister of Commerce and Industry of the Federal Republic of Somalia, a position he assumed in December 2025. He previously served as the Minister of Planning, Investment and Economic Development from 2017 to 2022 and as the Director of the IGAD Centre of Excellence for Climate Adaptation and Environmental Protection (CAEP) from 2022 to 2025 and Ambassador.

== Biography ==
Early Life and Education

Hassan was born in 1978 in Dhahar, located in the North Eastern state of Somalia. He holds dual Somali and Canadian citizenship

He possesses an extensive academic background:

• BA in Political Science from Carleton University in Ottawa, Canada.

• MA in Diplomacy and Foreign Policy from Moi University in Nairobi, Kenya.

• Master’s in Global Energy and Climate Policy from SOAS, University of London.

• As of 2025, he is a Ph.D. candidate in Environmental Studies at the University of York, specializing in environmental economics and management

Early Career and Diplomacy

Before entering high-level government service, Hassan worked for the Government of Canada and Carleton University. He also served as a Political Specialist for the United States Special Representative for Somalia (SRS) at the U.S. Embassy in Nairobi, focusing on democracy, governance, and human rights

In 2015, he was appointed as the Ambassador Extraordinary and Plenipotentiary of the Federal Republic of Somalia to Kenya. Concurrently, he served as the Ambassador to the Republic of Seychelles, the Union of the Comoros, and the Republic of Mauritius. During this time, he also acted as Somalia’s Permanent Representative to the United Nations Environment Programme (UNEP) and UN-Habitat

== Minister of Planning, Investment and Economic Development (2017–2022) ==
In April 2017, Hassan was appointed Minister of Planning, Investment and Economic Development (MoPIED) in the cabinet of Prime Minister Hassan Ali Khaire. During his five-year tenure, he oversaw significant institutional reforms and the reintroduction of national economic planning processes.

== Key Achievements ==
• National Development Plan (NDP-9): Hassan led the development and launch of the Ninth National Development Plan (2020–2024). The plan was recognized as compliant with the IMF's Interim Poverty Reduction Strategy Paper (iPRSP), a crucial benchmark that enabled Somalia to reach the "Decision Point" for debt relief under the Heavily Indebted Poor Countries (HIPC) Initiative.

• Institutional Building: He spearheaded the establishment of several autonomous government agencies, including the Somalia National Bureau of Statistics (SNBS), the National Economic Council (NEC), and the Investment Promotion Office (SOMINVEST).

• Aid Coordination: Hassan implemented the Aid Information Management System (AIMS) to track development funds and established a Donor Engagement Office to align off-budget aid with national priorities. Notably, he enforced a policy requiring international NGOs and UN agencies to relocate their primary operations from Nairobi to Mogadishu to improve accountability and local economic impact.

• Crisis Response: Following the severe drought of 2016–2017, he oversaw the Drought Impact and Needs Assessment (DINA) and the creation of the Recovery and Resilience Framework (RRF). He also established the National Durable Solutions Unit to address internal displacement

== IGAD Centre for Climate Adaptation (2022–2025) ==
Following his tenure as Planning Minister, Hassan was appointed by the Intergovernmental Authority on Development (IGAD) in September 2022 as the Director of the IGAD Centre of Excellence for Climate Adaptation and Environmental Protection (CAEP). The center, based in Mogadishu, was established to leverage research and scientific data to help the Horn of Africa region cope with climate change.

In this role, he represented Somalia at global forums, including the 2021 UN Climate Change Conference (COP26) in Glasgow, where he advocated for greater responsibility from developed nations regarding global emissions

== Minister of Commerce and Industry (2025–Present) ==
In mid-December 2025, Prime Minister Hamza Abdi Barre appointed Hassan as the Minister of Commerce and Industry. His appointment was viewed as a strategic move to revitalize Somalia’s trade and industrial sectors by leveraging his technical expertise and international experience

== Key Initiatives ==
• Somalia-China Relations: In December 2025, Hassan attended the Somalia-China Investment and Trade Forum in Beijing, advocating for partnerships beyond traditional merchandise trade, specifically in technology, infrastructure, and energy, within the framework of the Belt and Road Initiative (BRI).

• Industrial Recovery: His mandate includes reconnecting Somalia’s historical economic foundations—such as agriculture and manufacturing—with modern policy frameworks

== Political Stances and Reputation ==
Hassan is described as a technocrat and reformist with a reputation for political independence. He has historically taken strong stances on national sovereignty, evidenced by his push to regulate international NGOs and relocate their offices to Somalia. In mid-2025, prior to his return to the federal cabinet, he was considered a leading contender for the presidency of the newly formed North Eastern State in Somalia. He advocated for a unified administration for the Sool, Sanaag, and Cayn regions, distinct from the administrations of Somaliland and Puntland
