= Badhan, Sanaag =

Badhan Baran برن
- City
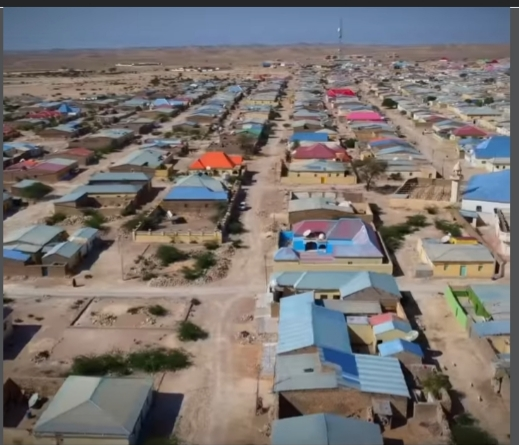

- Location in Sanaag Badhan (Somaliland) Badhan (Somalia)
- Coordinates: 10°42′50″N 48°20′5″E
- Country: Somalia
- Region: Sanaag
- District: Badhan

Government
  - Type: Local Council
  - Mayor: Awed Ali Hiirey

Population (2020)
  - Total: 65,500
- Time zone: UTC+3 (EAT)

Badhan (Somali: Badhan; Arabic: برن), also known as Baran, is a city in the Sanaag region.

== Overview ==
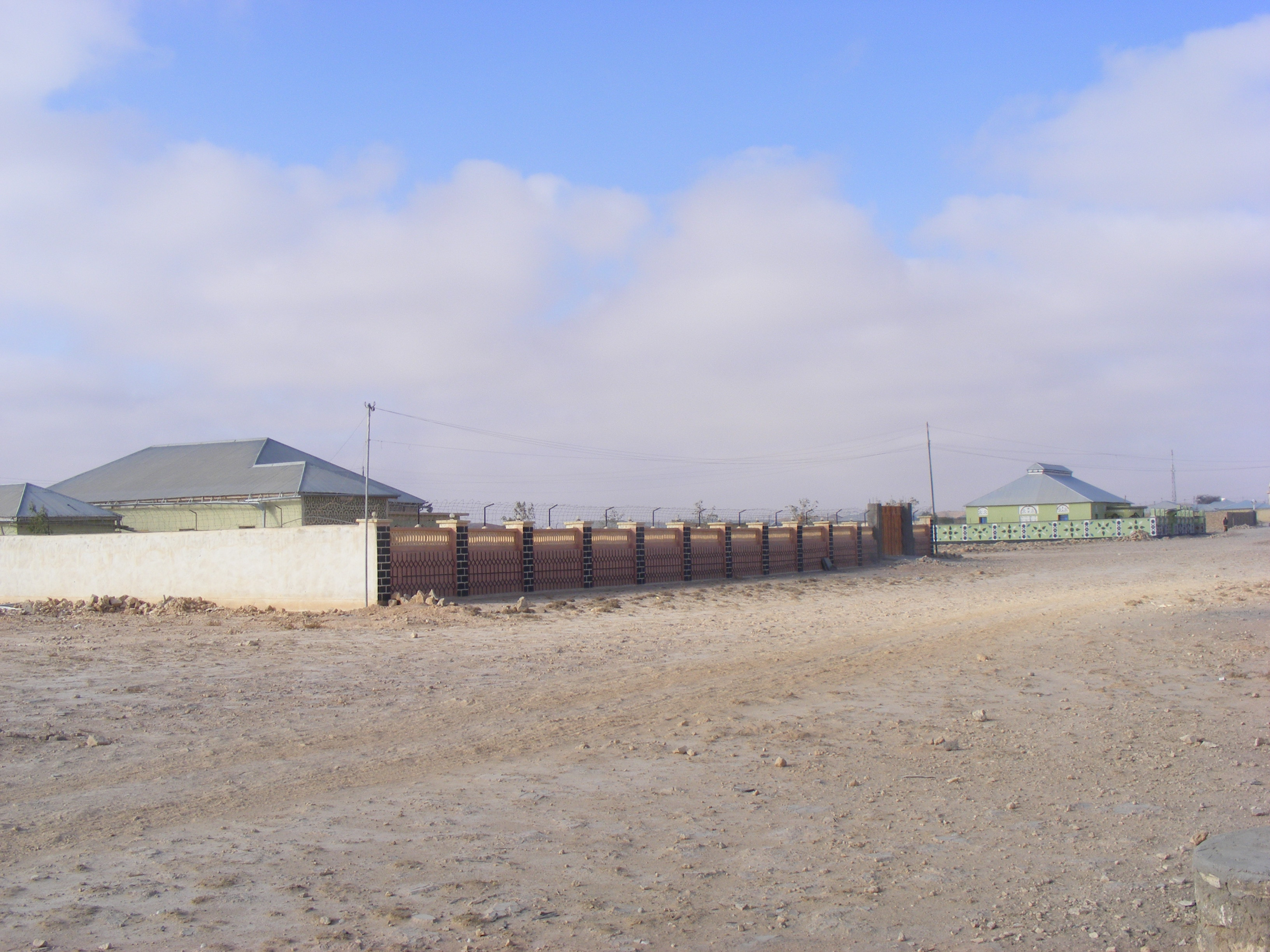
A residential area in Badhan.

Badhan is located in eastern Sanaag, an area disputed between Somaliland and Puntland, but has been under the de facto administration of Puntland for many years. Puntland administered local council elections in the city on 25 May 2023.

The town is inhabited by the Warsangali sub-clan of the Harti/Darod. It serves as an administrative and educational center for the East Sanaag area, and contains a branch campus of the Somali National University. It is also a transit hub for road networks in the region.

== Demographics ==
The UrbanStats project estimates the population of Badhan at 65,500, based on satellite imagery analysis rather than administrative boundaries.

The primary inhabitants of Badhan and its surrounding areas are the Warsangali clan (Harti/Darod). The town is used as a venue for Warsangali clan meetings.

Livestock farming is the primary economic activity in the region. During droughts, pastoralists relocate near water sources, which often leads to increases in water prices.

== Transport and logistics ==
Towns around Badhan

Badhan is a transit point on the route between the coastal town of Las Khorey and Erigavo. Road construction has been ongoing to link El Dahir, Badhan, and Erigavo. El Dahir connects the interior of Sanaag to the main highway linking Bosaso, Qardho, and Garowe.

== Politics ==
Badhan is a political center for the Warsangali clan and serves as a base for Puntland authorities in eastern Sanaag. While Somaliland maintains a nominal administrative claim and has appointed a mayor for Badhan, actual governance has been contested. Customary movements within the Warsangali clan have previously sought independent administrative structures, such as the Maakhir state between 2007 and 2009.

The city has a local council, which elects the mayor. Political contestation has led to security incidents; in September 2019, Puntland security forces arrested Somaliland's deputy governor for Badhan, and in January 2021, Puntland deployed military units to prevent Somaliland from conducting voter registration in the district.

== Mayor ==
Badhan is claimed by both Somaliland and Puntland, each with its own governor who orders it. Badhan mayor and Badhan district governor mean the same thing.

=== Somaliland ===
Name	Somali name	Term of office		
Name	Somali name	Took office	Left office	Time in office
Abdale Mahamed Fatah	Cabdalle Maxamed Faatax			
Abdihakim Ahmed Mahamud (Abdihakim Wahabi)	Cabdixakiin Axmed Maxamuud (Cabdixakiin Wahaabi)		Feb. 2017 (died in office)	
Ali Husein Mahamed (Ali Somali)	Cali Xuseen Maxamed (Cali Soomaali)	Mar. 2017	May 2019	2 years, 2 months
Mahamud Hamud Umar	Maxamuud Xaamud Cumar	Jun. 2019	Incumbent	7 years, 3 months

=== Puntland ===
Name	Somali name	Term of office		
Name	Somali name	Took office	Left office	Time in office
Abdirisak Ahmed Isse	Cabdirisaaq Axmed Ciise			
Ahmed Mahamed Timir	Axmed Maxamed Timir	Sep. 2019		
Awed Ali Hiirey	Cawed Cali Xiirey	Sep.2023	Incumbent	3 years, 1 month

== Education ==
The Somali National University has a branch campus in Badhan. Funding for the campus included a $6 million grant from the Kuwait Fund for Arab Economic Development, following an agreement between the fund and the Federal Government of Somalia, with construction managed by the Puntland authorities. The campus announced its academic programs and student admissions in September 2023, and held a district sports tournament in November 2023.

== Media ==
Local and regional media outlets operating in Badhan include Radio Daljir, Puntland State TV, and SBC Somali TV. National broadcasters such as Somali National Television (SNTV) and Radio Mogadishu also cover events in the city.

== Notable residents ==
- Mohammed Abdullah Hassan: Leader of the Dervish movement, who ordered the construction of a fort in Badhan.
- Mohamoud Ali Shire: Sultan of the Warsangali Sultanate.
- Abdillahi Mohammed Ahmed ("Qablan"): Somali government official, credited with regional infrastructure development including roads and wells in Sanaag.
- Jibrell Ali Salad: President of the regional Maakhir administration (2007–2009), which was established at Badhan.
- Fatima Jibrell: Environmentalist and founder of Horn Relief (Adeso), who established development programs in the district.
- Faisal Hawar: Businessman involved in development projects, including regional university facilities.
- Said Hassan Shire: Former Speaker of the Puntland House of Representatives.
- Gamal Mohamed Hassan: Former federal Minister of Planning for Somalia.

== History ==
=== Until Somalia independence ===
Prior to the colonial period, the Badhan area was part of the Warsangali Sultanate in eastern Sanaag.

During the Dervish movement in the 1910s, Mohammed Abdullah Hassan's forces established a military fort in Badhan.

In 1933, a severe drought led the British protectorate administration to open a relief camp in Badhan, which housed between 2,500 and 3,000 people. In 1945, local pastoralists from Zeila to Badhan protested against the administration's anti-locust campaigns that used poisoned bait, resulting in unrest in several localities.

Official surveys from 1951 recorded Badhan as a permanent settlement at approximately 10°43′N, 48°20′E.

=== Until Somali civil war (1960–1991) ===
Following Somali independence in 1960, Badhan was administered as an inland township of eastern Sanaag. In the 1970s, heavy rains caused severe flooding in the interior, prompting the government of Siad Barre to relocate the population of Xubeera to Badhan.

The 1974–1975 Abaartii Dabadheer drought also affected northern Somalia, leading to relief operations and population movements across Sanaag’s pastoral zones around Badhan.

=== Somali Civil War and Somaliland's founding ===
Through the 1980s, while conflict intensified elsewhere, districts inhabited by the Warsangeli in and around Badhan remained largely free from fighting up to the collapse of the central government in 1991.

After the Republic of Somaliland's 1991 declaration of independence, authority in the far east of the claimed territory remained uneven. Through most of the 1990s, the Somaliland administration largely left the Dhulbahante and Warsangali areas of Sool and eastern Sanaag to local customary leadership and arrangements around Badhan. Peace conferences during 1990–1997 stabilized much of Somaliland, but eastern Sanaag remained only partially integrated into Hargeisa's structures.

In the wider north-east, Harti–Darod constituencies, including the Warsangali around Badhan, participated in the process that led to the founding of the Puntland State in 1998, which developed from clan conferences and security coordination among Majeerteen, Dhulbahante and Warsangali leaders.

=== After Puntland’s founding (1998–2007) ===
Following the creation of Puntland in 1998, Badhan and the surrounding Warsangali-inhabited interior of eastern Sanaag developed links to Puntland's administration alongside local customary authority.

In November 2005, BBC Somali noted extreme water prices in Sanaag including Badhan district, reflecting depleted catchments and the cost of trucking water to inland settlements.

In parallel with Puntland's structures, Somaliland sought to project administrative claims eastwards in the early 2000s, creating a nominal "Badhan" region, while Puntland announced the Haylan region; on the ground, Warsangali communities around Badhan continued to manage affairs through their own councils and elders.

Amid frictions with Puntland over resources and security, Warsangali leaders declared the short-lived Maakhir State in mid-2007, naming Badhan its hub; the announcement followed communal meetings in Badhan and Dhahar in early July 2007.

=== Somaliland and Puntland (2008–2017) ===
In February 2008, Somaliland troops entered Badhan following a Puntland withdrawal, changing the control of the interior of eastern Sanaag around the town.

In June 2013, Somaliland forces took control of Badhan district from Puntland forces. Later that year, a visit by a Puntland presidential candidate drew protests from Somaliland-focused media for violating Somaliland's sovereignty claims.

In March 2014, Somaliland troops again entered Badhan, and the situation subsequently stabilized.

On 19 October 2015, eight members of the Somaliland National Electoral Commission were detained by Puntland authorities in Badhan district and released shortly thereafter.

In mid-2016, Somaliland proceeded with elements of its voter registration rollout in eastern Sanaag. On 18 July 2016, the Somaliland-appointed Badhan mayor stated that registration was proceeding across the district, and on 17 July 2016 Somaliland's defense minister visited Badhan amid tensions in eastern Sanaag.

In February 2017, the Somaliland-appointed Badhan district governor died in Hargeisa.

=== Puntland's administrative (2018–2023) ===
In 2018, Puntland authorities increased their administrative presence in Badhan. On 20 September 2018, the Puntland cabinet held a formal session in Badhan, and the following day a presidential delegation arrived in the town. In early 2018, Somalia's federal planning minister also visited Badhan and Dhahar with Puntland officials.

On 30 May 2019, the Somaliland-appointed governor of Badhan resigned and joined Puntland, and on 5 September 2019, the Badhan district council elected Ahmed Mohamed Timir as mayor in a process administered by Puntland's Ministry of Interior. Days later, Puntland security forces arrested Somaliland's deputy governor for Badhan district.

In January 2021, Puntland deployed forces to Badhan to prevent Somaliland's voter registration, and a delegation led by the Speaker of the Puntland Parliament visited the town. Puntland authorities announced the deployment of police units to Badhan on 17 June 2021 to reinforce local security. On 20 October 2021, local elders in Badhan issued a public statement separating the town from reported evictions in Erigavo.

On 25 May 2023, the Transitional Puntland Electoral Commission (TPEC) conducted direct municipal elections in Badhan as part of the state's local polls.

=== Recent History (2024–) ===
During 2024–2025, tensions occurred between Puntland and the federal government over constitutional amendments. Puntland announced a freeze in cooperation with federal institutions in March and April 2024, but local administration in Badhan functioned under Puntland's framework.

In October 2024, an armed clash occurred outside Badhan between Puntland forces and troops aligned with the self-proclaimed Maakhir authorities, resulting in a standoff without major casualties initially reported. In the broader Sanaag area, further confrontations occurred in mid-2025 around Ceelbuh due to disputes over administrative alignment.
