= Hingalol =

- Town
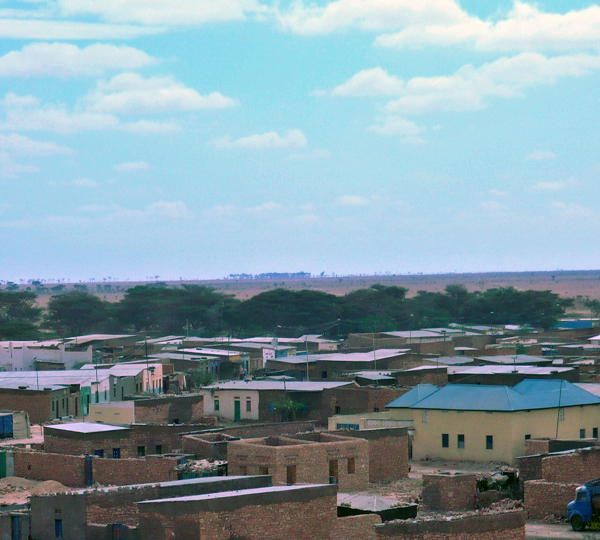

- Location in Somalia
- Coordinates: 9°45′16″N 48°18′34″E
- Country: Somalia
- Regional State: (Somalia) North East
- Region: Sanaag
- Established: 1958

Population (2007)
  - Total: 35,000
- Time zone: UTC+3 (EAT)

Hingalol or Hingalool (Somali: Xingalool) is a district located in the Sanaag region of North East State of Somalia.

== Overview ==
Hingalol is situated on the Hadeed Plateau of the Sanaag region. Hingalol was established in 1958. A small hamlet, it increased in size and population in the wake of the Somali Civil War and became a full district. In November 2017, Puntland built a military base on the outskirt of the city. In October 2020, Puntland Minister of Education and Minister of Agriculture visited Hingalol to assess needs and support schools and other institutions in the district.

While growing at a faster pace, basic services and government assistance are lacking. In September 2021, the local hospital reported serious cases of COVID-19 in the Hingalol area. For the first time, the Federal Government in Mogadishu delivered essential medical supplies and equipments.

== Education ==
Hingalol has several academic institutions. According to the Puntland Ministry of Education, there are 11 primary schools in the Hingalol District. Among these are Mindhicir, Shibiraale, Carmale and Darul Qur'aan. Secondary schools in the area include the Hingalol Secondary School. In addition, the new Hingalol Public Library provides a wide range of information and needed library services to users of all ages and abilities, and, in so doing, it remains a significant community asset. It also offers online courses
