= Abshar Rural District =

Rural district in Khuzestan province, Iran

Abshar Rural District Persian: دهستان آبشار
- Rural District
- Location within Iran
- Coordinates: 30°29′07″N 48°42′52″E
- Country: Iran
- Province: Khuzestan
- County: Shadegan
- District: Central
- Capital: Nahr-e Jadid

Population (2016)
  - Total: 14,309
- Time zone: UTC+3:30 (IRST)

Abshar Rural District (Persian: دهستان آبشار) is in the Central District of Shadegan County, Khuzestan province, Iran. Its capital is the village of Nahr-e Jadid.

== Demographics ==
=== Population ===
At the time of the 2006 National Census, the rural district's population was 10,832 in 1,991 households. There were 13,016 inhabitants in 2,988 households at the following census of 2011. The 2016 census measured the population of the rural district as 14,309 in 3,517 households. The most populous of its 22 villages was Nahr-e Meseyyer, with 3,917 people.
