= Cairn =

Human-made pile of stones or burial monument

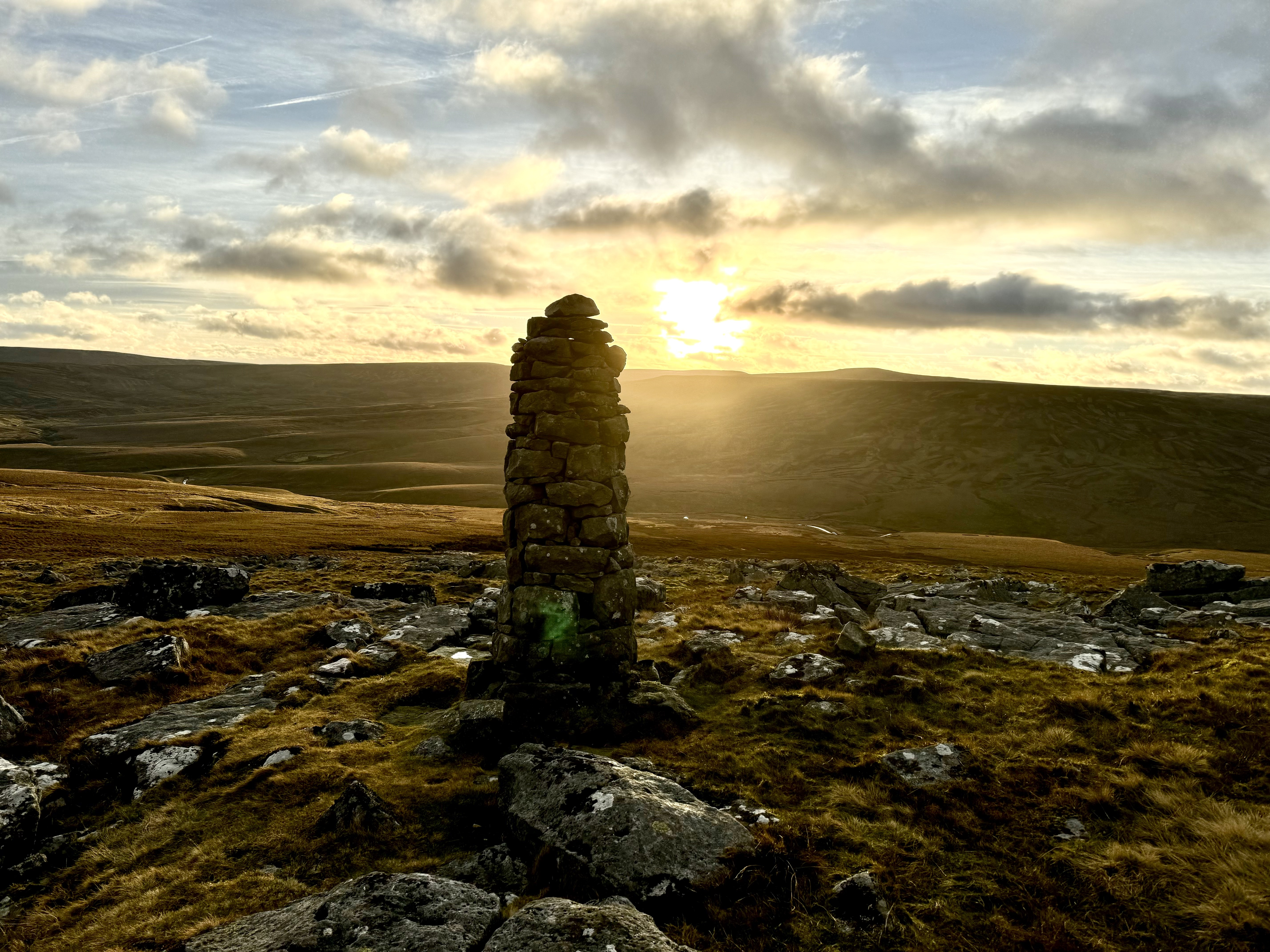
A cairn a mile east of Nine Standards Rigg in the Yorkshire Dales

A cairn (/ˈkɛərn/) is a human-made pile (or stack) of stones raised for a purpose, usually as a marker or as a burial mound. The word cairn comes from the Irish: carn [ˈkʰaːrˠn̪ˠ] (plural cairn [ˈkʰaːrˠɲ]).

Cairns have been and are used for a broad variety of purposes. In prehistory, they were raised as markers, as memorials and as burial monuments, some of which contained chambers.

In the modern era, cairns are often raised as landmarks, especially to mark the summits of mountains, and as trail markers. They vary in size from small piles of stones to entire artificial hills, and in complexity from loose conical rock piles to elaborate megalithic structures. Cairns may be painted or otherwise decorated, whether for increased visibility or for religious reasons.

== History ==
=== Europe ===
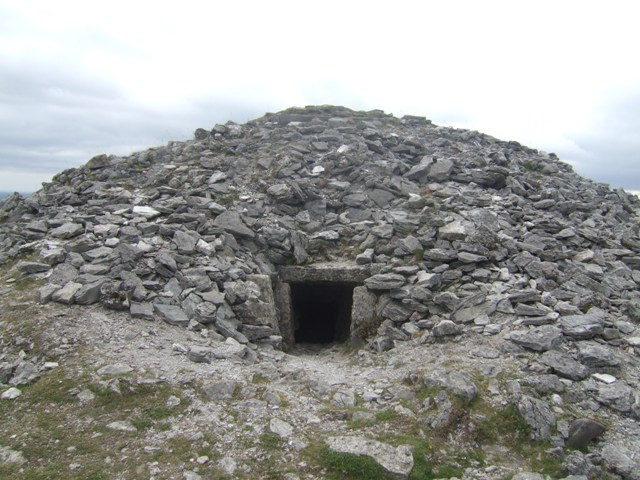
One of the cairns at Carrowkeel Megalithic Cemetery in Ireland, which covers a passage tomb

The building of cairns for various purposes goes back into prehistory in Eurasia, ranging in size from small rock sculptures to substantial human-made hills of stone, some built on top of larger, natural hills. The human-made hills are often relatively massive Bronze Age or earlier structures which, like kistvaens and dolmens, frequently contain burials. They are comparable to tumuli (kurgans), but of stone construction instead of earthworks. Cairn originally could more broadly refer to types of hills and natural stone piles, but today is used exclusively for artificial ones.

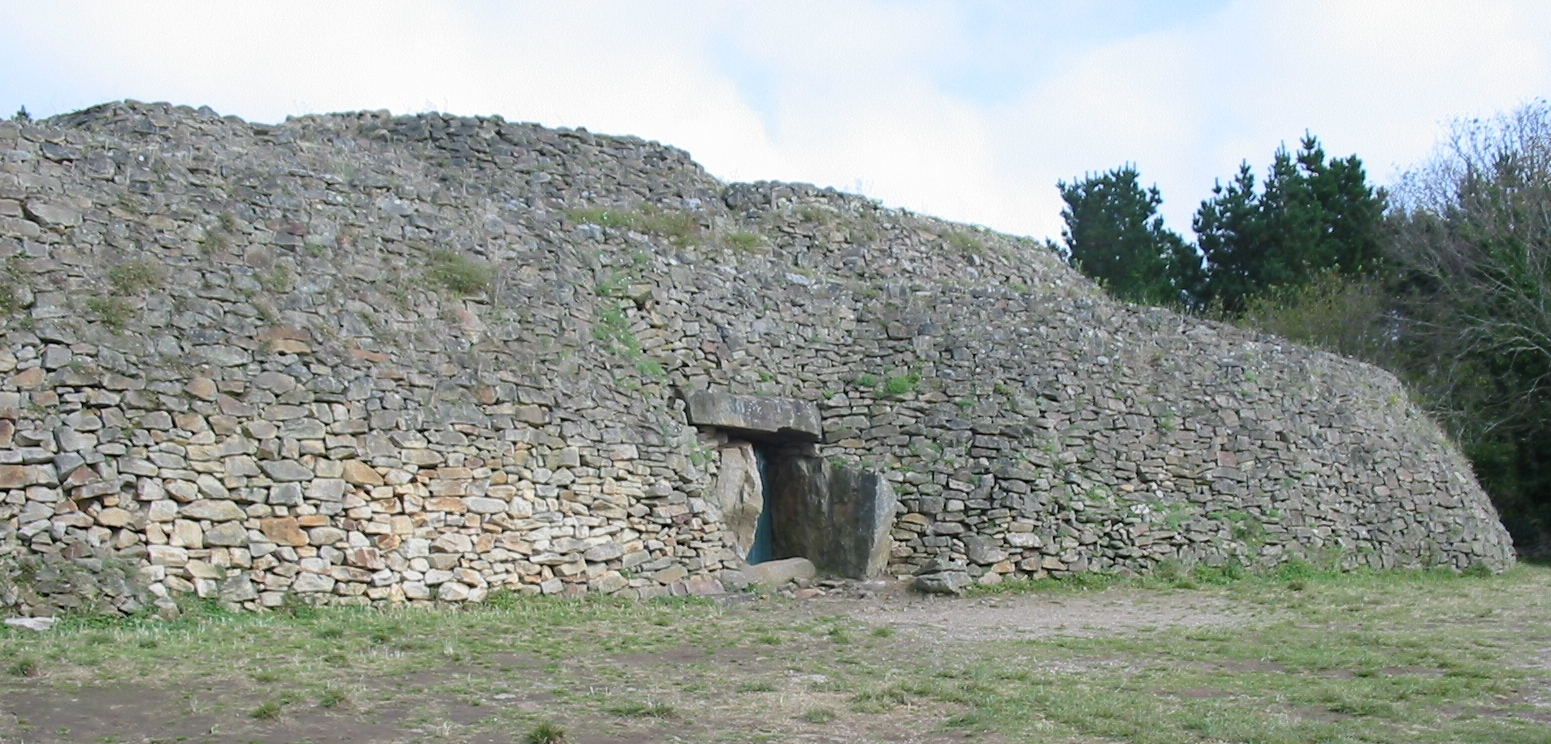
A cairn of the Neolithic-era passage tomb on Gavrinis island, Brittany

==== Ireland and Britain ====
The word cairn derives from Irish (with the same meaning), which is essentially the same as the corresponding words in other native Celtic languages of Ireland, Brittany and Britain, including Welsh carn (and carnedd), Breton karn, Irish carn, and Cornish karn or carn. Cornwall (Kernow) itself may actually be named after the cairns that dot its landscape, such as Cornwall's highest point, Brown Willy Summit Cairn, a 5 m (16 ft) high and 24 m (79 ft) diameter mound atop Brown Willy hill in Bodmin Moor, an area with many ancient cairns.

Burial cairns and other megaliths are the subject of legends and folklore throughout Ireland and Britain. In Ireland, it is traditional to carry a stone up from the bottom of a hill to place on a cairn at its top. In such a fashion, cairns would grow ever larger. An old Scottish Gaelic blessing is Cuiridh mi clach air do chàrn, "I'll put a stone on your cairn". In Highland folklore it is recounted that before Highland clans fought in a battle, each man would place a stone in a pile. Those who survived the battle returned and removed a stone from the pile. The stones that remained were built into a cairn to honour the dead.

Cairns in the region were also put to vital practical use. For example, Dún Aonghasa, an all-stone Iron Age Irish hill fort on Inishmore in the Aran Islands, is still surrounded by small cairns and strategically placed jutting rocks, used collectively as an alternative to defensive earthworks because of the karst landscape's lack of soil.

In February 2020, ancient cairns dated back to 4,500 year-old used to bury the leaders or chieftains of Neolithic tribes people were revealed in the Cwmcelyn in Blaenau Gwent by the Aberystruth Archaeological Society.

==== Scandinavia and Iceland ====
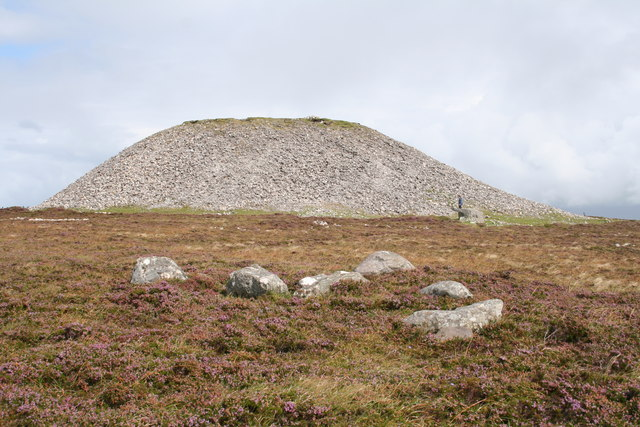
The biggest cairn in Ireland, Maeve's Cairn on Knocknarea

In Scandinavia, cairns have been used for centuries as trail and sea marks, among other purposes, the most notable being the Three-Country Cairn. In Iceland, cairns were often used as markers along the numerous single-file roads or paths that crisscrossed the island; many of these ancient cairns are still standing, although the paths have disappeared. In Norse Greenland, cairns were used as a hunting implement, a game-driving "lane", used to direct reindeer towards a game jump.

==== Greece and the Balkans ====
Cairn out of porphyr rocks on the alpine pasture Resciesa in Gherdëina, an Unesco World Heritage

In the mythology of ancient Greece, cairns were associated with Hermes, the god of overland travel. According to one legend, Hermes was put on trial by Hera for slaying her favorite servant, the monster Argus. All of the other gods acted as a jury, and as a way of declaring their verdict they were given pebbles, and told to throw them at whichever person they deemed to be in the right, Hermes or Hera. Hermes argued so skillfully that he ended up buried under a heap of pebbles, and this was the first cairn. In Croatia, in areas of ancient Dalmatia, such as Herzegovina and the Krajina, they are known as gromila.

==== Portugal ====
In Portugal, a cairn is called a moledro. In a legend the moledros are enchanted soldiers, and if one stone is taken from the pile and put under a pillow, in the morning a soldier will appear for a brief moment, then will change back to a stone and magically return to the pile. The cairns that mark the place where someone died or cover the graves alongside the roads where in the past people were buried are called Fiéis de Deus. The same name given to the stones was given to the dead whose identity was unknown.

=== North and northeast Africa ===
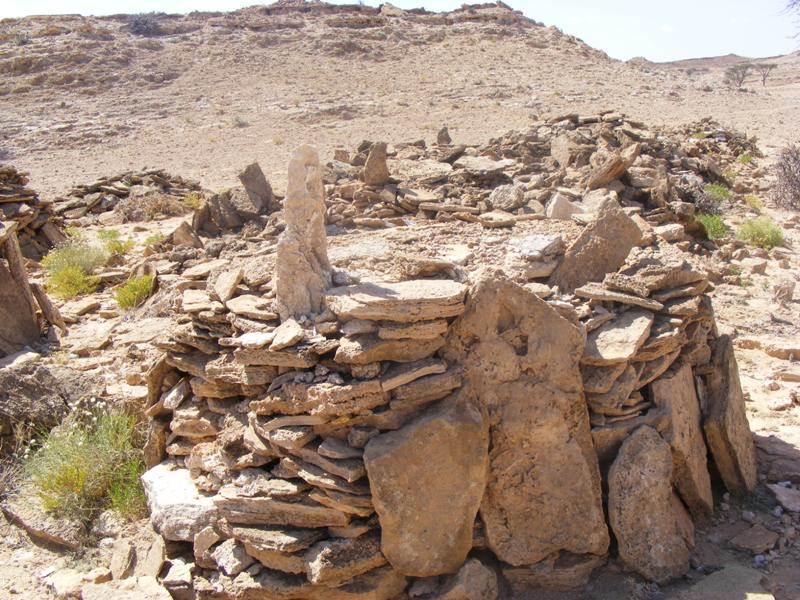
Ancient cairns in Qa'ableh, Somalia

Cairns (taalo) are a common feature at El Ayo, Haylan, Qa'ableh, Qombo'ul, Heis, Salweyn and Gelweita, among other places. Somalia in general is home to a lot of such historical settlements and archaeological sites wherein are found numerous ancient ruins and buildings, many of obscure origins. Many of these old structures have yet to be properly explored, a process which would help shed further light on local history and facilitate their preservation for posterity.

Since Neolithic times, the climate of North Africa has become drier. A reminder of the desertification of the area is provided by megalithic remains, which occur in a great variety of forms and in vast numbers in presently arid and uninhabitable wastelands: cairns (kerkour), dolmens and circles like Stonehenge, underground cells excavated in rock, barrows topped with huge slabs, and step pyramid-like mounds.

=== Middle East ===
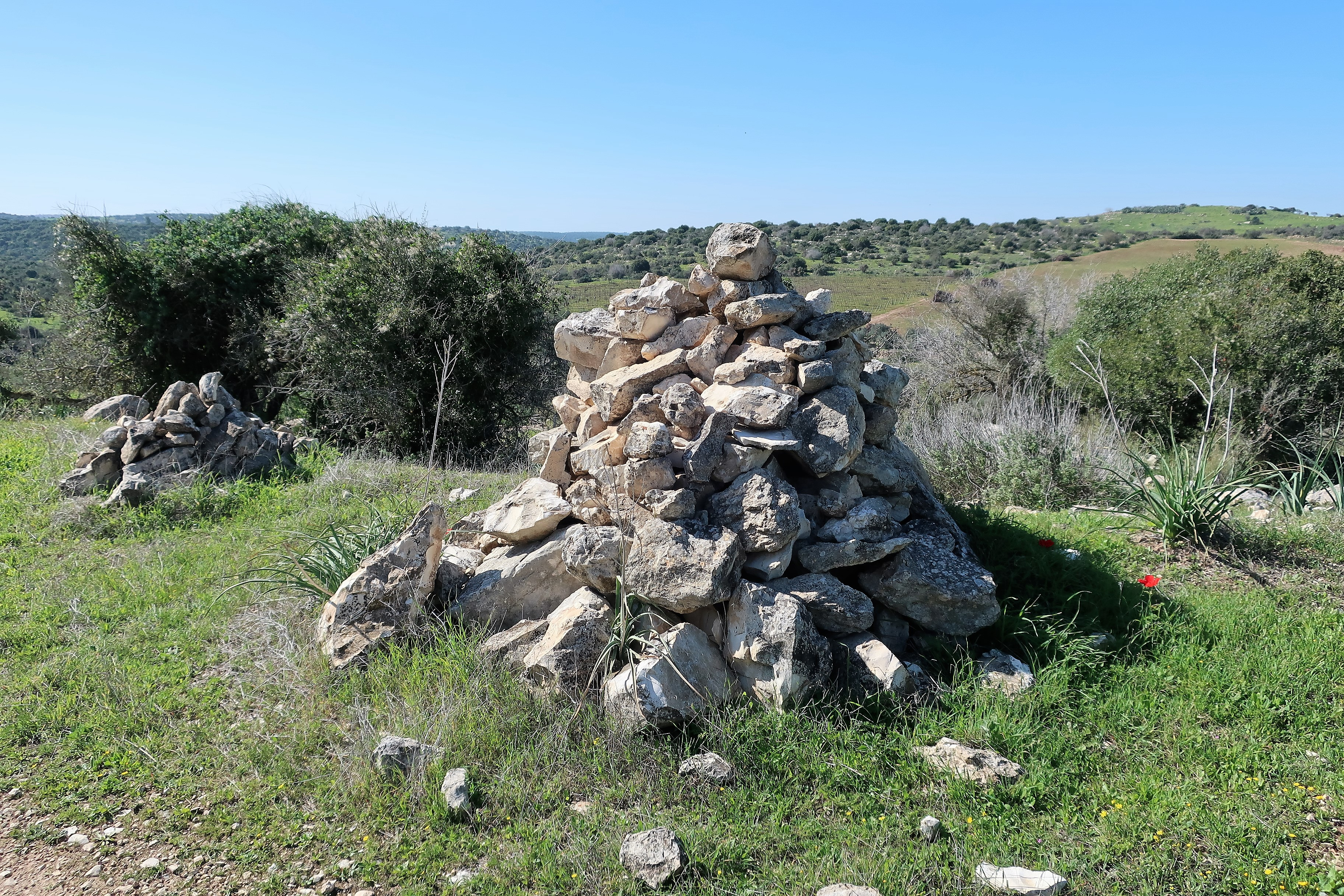
A cairn in the Judean mountains

The Biblical place name Gilead (mentioned in the Old Testament books of Genesis, Numbers, Judges and elsewhere) means literally 'a heap of testimony (or evidence)' as does its Aramaic translation Yegar Sahaduta. In modern Hebrew, gal-'ed (גל-עד) is the actual word for "cairn". In Genesis 31:45-48, the cairn of Gilead was set up as a border demarcation between Jacob and his father-in-law Laban at their last meeting.

=== Asia and the Pacific ===
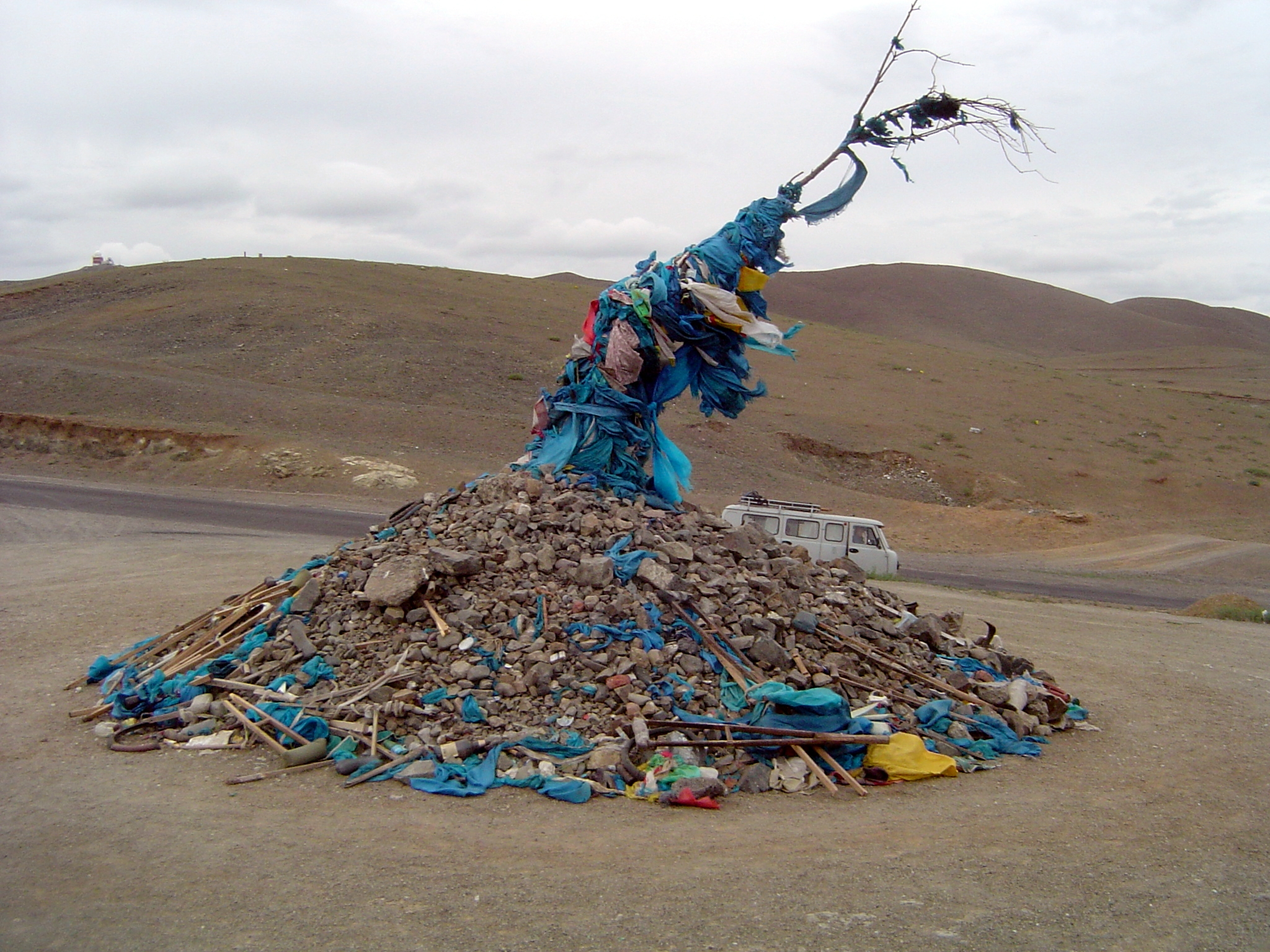
A Mongolian ceremonial cairn (ovoo)

Starting in the Bronze Age, burial cists were sometimes interred into cairns, which would be situated in conspicuous positions, often on the skyline above the village of the deceased. Though most often found in the British Isles, evidence of Bronze Age cists have been found in Mongolia. The stones may have been thought to deter grave robbers and scavengers. Another explanation is that they were to stop the dead from rising.

There remains a Jewish tradition of placing small stones on a person's grave as a token of respect, known as visitation stones, though this is generally to relate the longevity of stone to the eternal nature of the soul and is not usually done in a cairn fashion. Stupas in India and Tibet probably started out in a similar fashion, although they now generally contain the ashes of a Buddhist saint or lama.

A traditional and often decorated, heap-formed cairn called an ovoo is made in Mongolia. It primarily serves religious purposes, and finds use in both Tengriist and Buddhist ceremonies. Ovoos were also often used as landmarks and meeting points in traditional nomadic Mongolian culture. Traditional ceremonies still take place at ovoos today, and in a survey conducted, 75 participants out of 144 participants stated that they believe in ovoo ceremonies. However, mining and other industrial operations today threaten the ovoos.

In Hawaii, cairns, called by the Hawaiian word ahu, are still being built today. Though in other cultures, the cairns were typically used as trail markers and sometimes funerary sites, the ancient Hawaiians also used them as altars or security towers. The Hawaiian people are still building these cairns today, using them as the focal points for ceremonies honoring their ancestors and spirituality.

In South Korea, cairns are quite prevalent, often found along roadsides and trails, up on mountain peaks, and adjacent to Buddhist temples. Hikers frequently add stones to existing cairns trying to get just one more on top of the pile, to bring good luck. This tradition has its roots in the worship of San-shin, or Mountain Spirit, so often still revered in Korean culture.

=== The Americas ===
Throughout what today are the continental United States and Canada, some Indigenous peoples of the Americas have built structures similar to cairns. In some cases, these are general trail markers, and in other cases they mark game-driving "lanes", such as those leading to buffalo jumps.

==== Religious practices (North America) ====
- Stacked rock features have been noted to have religious significance to the Klamath and Modoc Tribes of indigenous people of the Western United States, the respective tribes prohibiting photography of or touching the stone formations. These cairn-like structures are noted to be constructed for ritual and prayer purposes. Indigenous tribes practiced piling rocks (forming a rock cairn) as a step in a series of physically demanding tasks in part of a ritual to receive what they call spirit dreams. This practice is part of the vision quest ritual within the puberty rite the boys of the tribe undergo.
- Cairns were often used to mark the cremation sites for burial practices. When the Klamath tribe traveled within their territory, a person may pass away during this period. If the death occurs away from their village, the passed person would be buried near where they passed and a cairn would be constructed to mark this site. Burial cairns constructed by indigenous people, taking the shape of stone mounds, have been found throughout the Midwest and South of the United States. These mounds are typically made in large piles and mark the burial site, also protecting it from wildlife.

Peoples from some of the Indigenous cultures of arctic North America (i.e. northern Canada, Alaska and Greenland) have built carefully constructed stone sculptures called inuksuit and inunnguat, which serve as landmarks and directional markers. The oldest of these structures are very old and pre-date contact with Europeans. They are iconic of the region (an inuksuk even features on the flag of the Canadian far-northeastern territory, Nunavut).

Cairns have been used throughout what is now Latin America, since pre-Columbian times, to mark trails. Even today, in the Andes of South America, the Quechuan peoples build cairns as part of their spiritual and religious traditions.

== Today ==
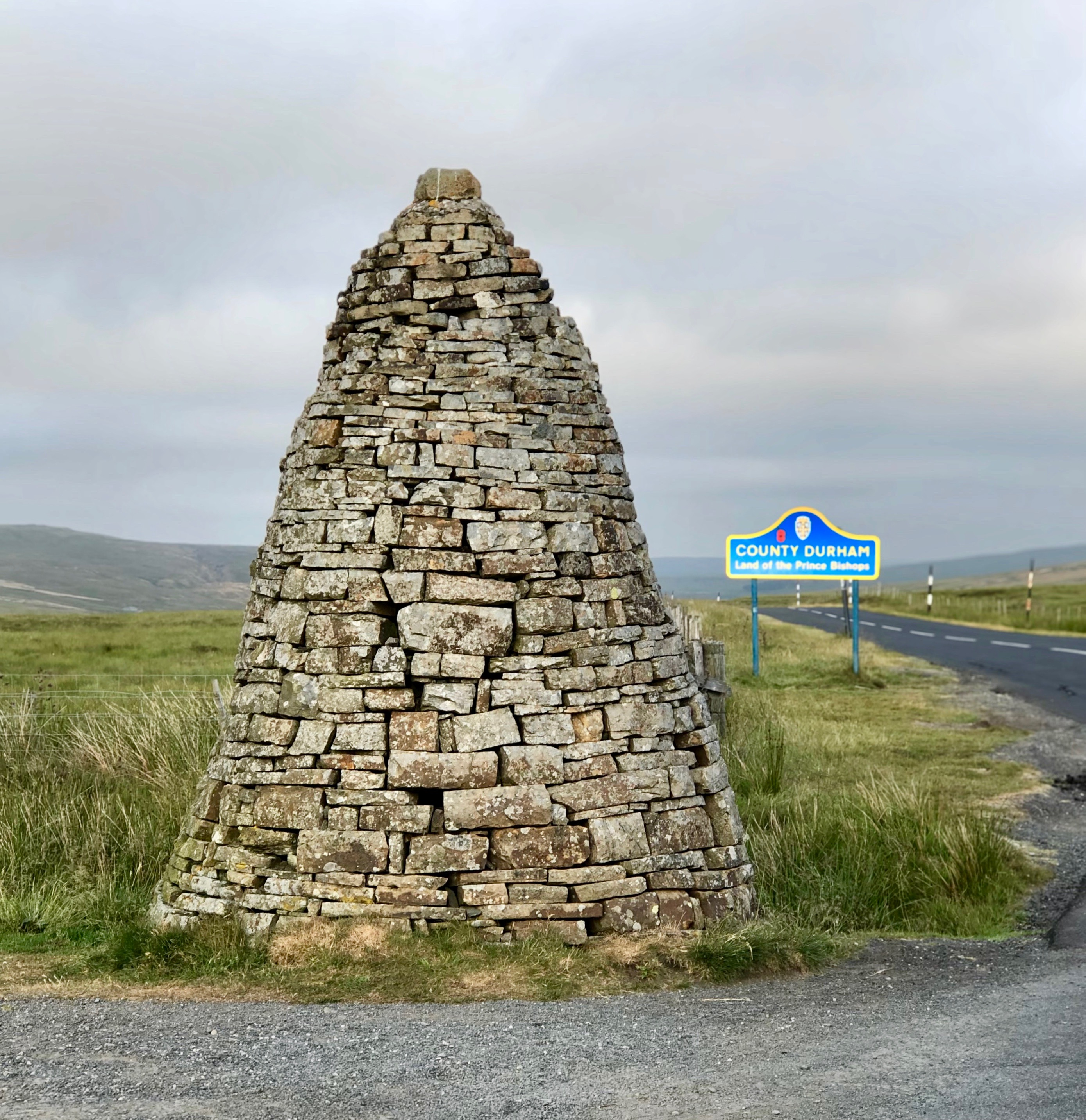
A cairn at the boundary of Counties Durham and Northumberland, England

Cairns can be used to mark hiking trails, especially in mountain regions at or above the tree line. Placed at regular intervals, a series of cairns can be used to indicate a path across stony or barren terrain.

=== Sea cairns ===
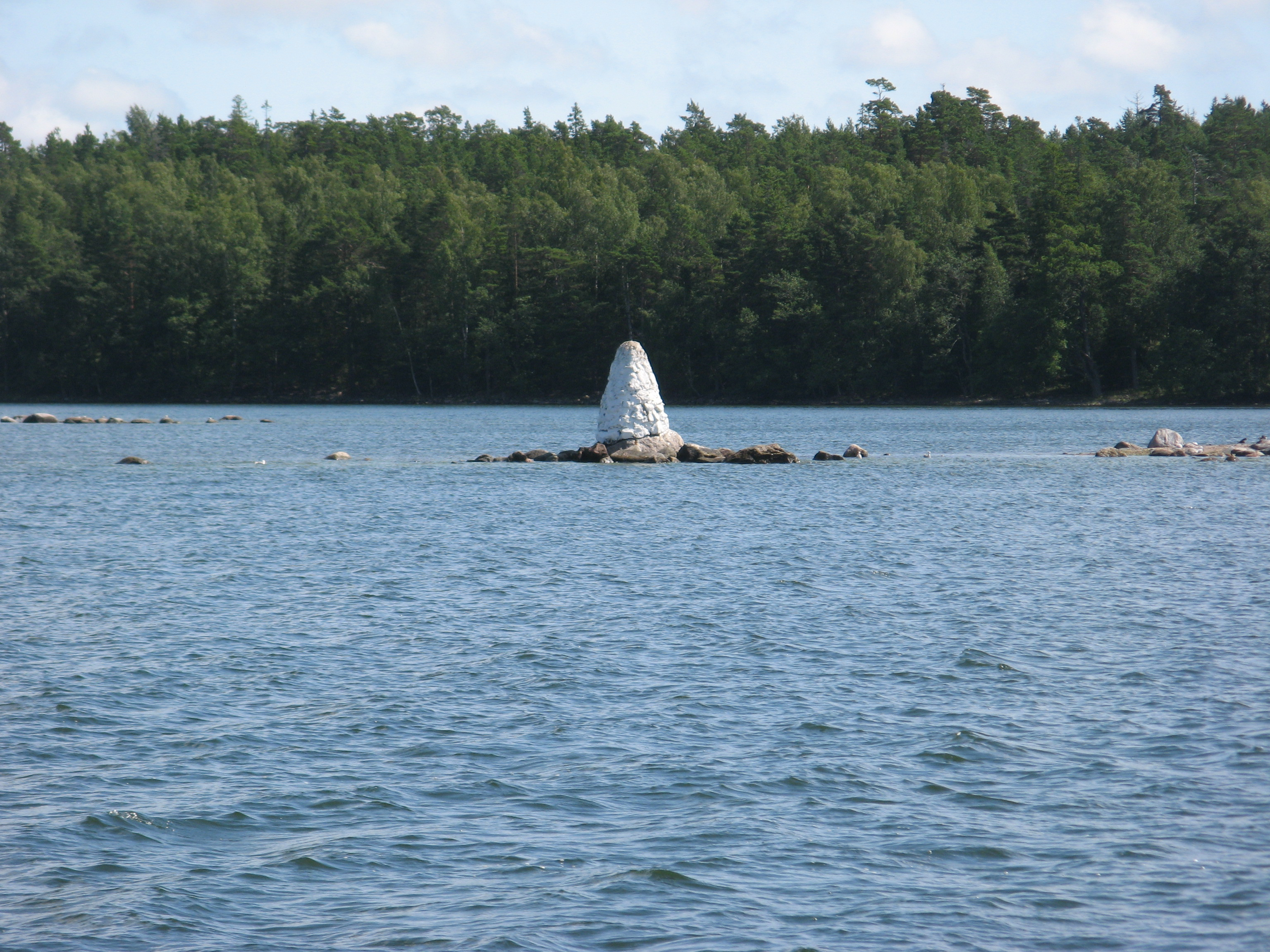
A sea mark in Finnish coastal waters

Coastal cairns called sea marks are also common in the northern latitudes, especially in the island-strewn waters of Scandinavia and eastern Canada. They are placed along shores and on islands and islets. Usually painted white for improved offshore visibility, they serve as navigation aids. In Swedish, they are called kummel, in Finnish kummeli, in Norwegian varde, and are indicated in navigation charts and maintained as part of the nautical marking system.

== Other types ==
- Chambered cairn
- Clava cairn
- Clearance cairn
- Court cairn
- Pyramid
- Ring cairn
- Tumulus
- Unchambered long cairn

== Concerns ==
Concerns have been raised over the construction of needless cairns.

The Hawaiian Volcano Observatory asks visitors to say “no” to rock piles after a surge in the creation of cairns by visitors. The construction of these rock formations comes at the cost of important geological features that visitors pry rocks off of. The practice is viewed as an act of graffiti on the landscape of the park.

The US National Park Service has a set of rules regarding public interaction with cairns found within the boundaries of the park. Falling within the rules set by the Leave No Trace rule, the Park Service has three rules:

- Do not tamper with cairns
- Do not build unauthorized cairns
- Do not add to existing cairns

This guideline is made with the intent of preventing needless cairns created by visitors and preventing the destruction of important trail-marking cairns.

== See also ==
- Boundary marker
- Cairn Terrier
- Crossroads (mythology)
- Dry stone
- Herm (sculpture) – Type of classical sculpture
- Hörgr – Type of altar or cult site, possibly consisting of a heap of stones
- Inuksuk
- Kerb (archaeology)
- Leacht – Small stone structure in early Christian Ireland
- Rock balancing
- Rujm – Arabic place name
- Seonangdang – Holy cairns and trees in Korea
- Stele
- Tumulus
