= Abdirahman bin Isma'il al-Jabarti =

Legendary ancestor of the Somali Darod clan

- Daarood
- Died: 10th/11th century Haylan region
- Burial place: Haylan, Sanaag, Somalia
- Spouse: Dombiro Dir
- Children: 5

Abdirahman bin Isma'il al-Jabarti, (Arabic: عبدالرحمن بن اسماعيل الجبرتي) also known as Daarood, Dawud or Da'ud (Arabic: دارود), is the semi-legendary common ancestor of the Somali Darod clan and the Harla people.

According to local tradition, Abdirahman descended from Aqil ibn Abi Talib, a member of the Banu Hashim and a cousin of the Islamic prophet Muhammad. This claim of descendance, like similar claims of Arab descent made by other clans and which are typical for Somali clan genealogy, is historically untenable.

== Biography ==
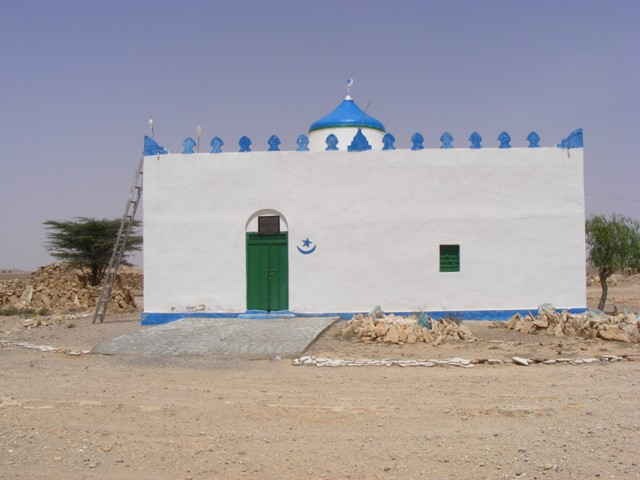
Sheikh Darod's tomb in Haylaan, an ancient town in the eastern Sanaag region of Somalia.

Authors such as Ibn Hawqal, Al-Muqaddasi and Ibn Said have confirmed the early presence of Arabian tribes in municipalities such as Berbera, Zeila, Jabarta (an old metropolis now in ruins), and Massawa in the northern Horn of Africa.

According to Somali tradition, Muhammad ibn Aqil's descendant Abdirahman bin Isma'il al-Jabarti (Darood) fled his homeland in the Arabian Peninsula after an argument with his uncle. During the 10th or 11th century CE he is believed to have then settled in Somalia just across the Red Sea. He subsequently married Dobira, the daughter of the Dir clan chief, which is said to have given rise to the Darood clan family. Thus, it established matrilateral ties with the Samaale main stem.

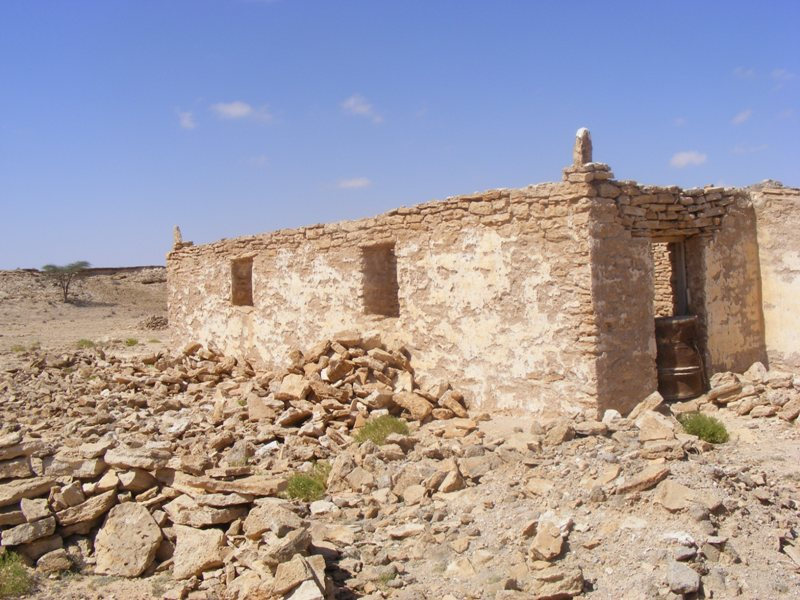
Sheikh Harti's tomb in Qa’ableh.

According to the British anthropologist and Somali Studies veteran I.M. Lewis, while the traditions of descent from noble Arab families related to Muhammad are most probably expressions of the importance of Islam in Somali society, "there is a strong historically valid component in these legends which, in the case of the Darood, is confirmed in the current practice of a Dir representative officiating at the ceremony of installation of the chief of the Darod family."

Another tradition holds that Darod is connected with the extinct Harla people. According to Arabic documents preserved by the Darod clans of Afar region, the Darut, a forefather of Harla founded the current Somali Darod clan. The text further states that he arrived from Mecca and settled in Zeila, his father was Ismāʻīl b. Ibrāhīm al-Ǧabartī, from Yemen.

According to Virginia Luling, Somali traditions reflected their adherence to Islam through legends that traced their ancestry back to the lineage of the prophet Muhammad. A similar clan story exists for the Isaaq, who are descended from one Ishaq ibn Ahmad al-'Alawi, another purported member of the Banu Hashim who came to Somaliland around the same time. As with Sheikh Isaaq, there are also numerous existing hagiologies in Arabic which describe Sheikh Darood's travels, works and overall life in Somaliland, as well as his movements in Arabia before his arrival. Besides historical sources such as Al-Masudi's Aqeeliyoon, a modern manaaqib (a collection of glorious deeds) printed in Cairo in 1945 by Sheikh Ahmad bin Hussen bin Mahammad titled Manaaqib as-Sheikh Ismaa'iil bin Ibraahiim al-Jabarti also discusses Sheikh Darod and his proposed father Isma'il al-Jabarti, the latter of whom is reportedly buried in Bab Siham situated in the Zabid District of western Yemen.

Sheikh Darod's own tomb is in Haylaan, situated in the Hadaaftimo Mountains in the Sanaag region of Somalia, and is the scene of frequent pilgrimages. Sheikh Isaaq is buried nearby in Maydh, as is Sheikh Harti, a descendant of Sheikh Darod and the progenitor of the Harti Darod sub-clan, whose tomb is located in the ancient town of Qa’ableh.

Sheikh Darod's mawlid (birthday) is also celebrated every Friday with a public reading of his manaaqib.
