= Las Khorey =

Las Qoray Laasqoray لاسقُرَي
- Town
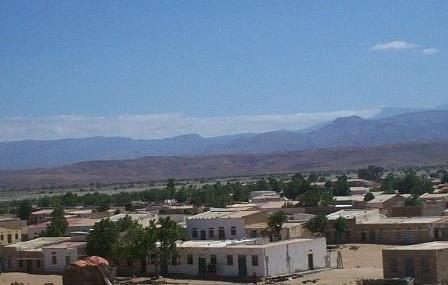
- View of a residential area in old Las Qoray.

- Location in Somalia Las Qoray (Somalia)
- Coordinates: 11°11′N 48°13′E
- Country: Somalia / Somaliland (Disputed)
- Region: Sanaag
- District: Badhan District

Population (2021)
  - Total: 15,000
- Time zone: UTC+3 (EAT)

Las Qoray (Somali: Laasqoray, Arabic: لاسقُرَى Lāsqoray) is a historic coastal town in the Sanaag region of Somalia.

BBC reported in 2021, "The Navy or Somalia Coast Guard is one of the military departments of Somalia, operating on the coast of Somaliland in Las Qoray, Zeila and Berbera." Somaliland National TV (SLNTV) reported in its September 2023 broadcast that Las Qoray is a territory of Somaliland. Hiiraan Online reported in a January 2024 article, "Las Qoray is outside Hargeisa's control." Andrew Palmer, CEO of the maritime consultancy Idarat Ltd, describes Las Qoray as "on the north coast of Puntland" in 2014. Awet Tewelde Weldemichael, an associate professor at Queen's University, wrote in his book "Puntland coast between Las Qoray and Hafun" in 2019.

== History ==
=== Ancient times ===
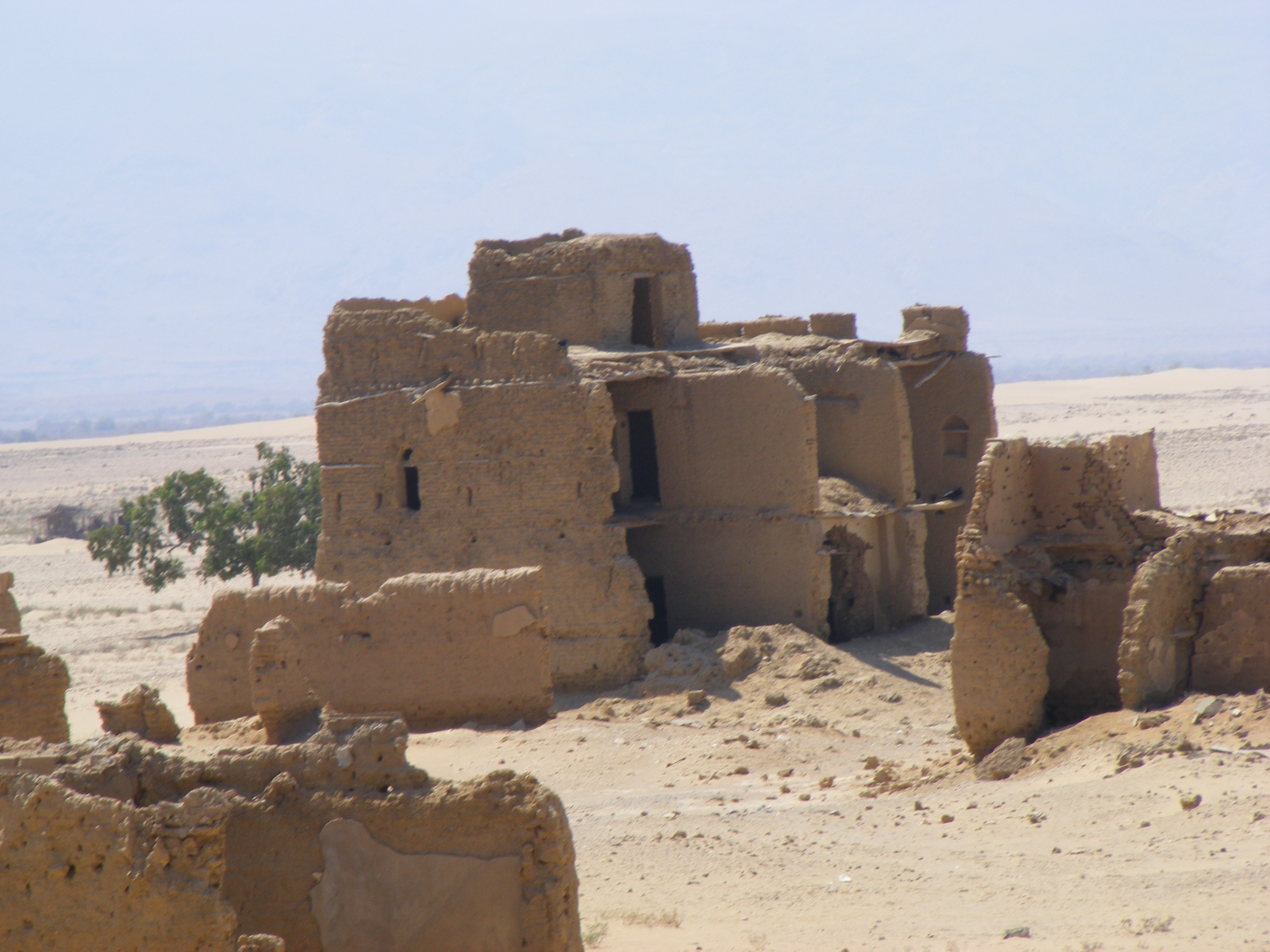
Ruins of Las Qoray.

The Las Qoray settlement is several centuries old. Between the town and El Ayo lies Karinhegane, a site containing numerous cave paintings of both real and mythical animals. Each painting has an inscription below it, which collectively have been estimated to be around 2,500 years old. Around 25 miles (40 km) from Las Qoray is found Gelweita, another key rock art site. Karinhegane's rock art is in the same distinctive Ethiopian-Arabian style as the Laas Gaal cave paintings.

Somaliland is home to numerous such archaeological sites, with similar edifices found at Haylan, Qa’ableh, Qombo'ul and El Ayo. However, many of these old structures have yet to be properly explored, a process which would help shed further light on local history and facilitate their preservation for posterity.

=== Medieval to Early Modern ===
In the 13th century, Dhidhin, chief of Warsangali, a branch of Darod, rose to power around now Las Qoray and took the title of Garaad as the monarch's title.

The town of Las Qoray began in 1735 when Al-sheikh Cali Maxamud Nuux of the Ugaslabe/Warsangali clan built a mosque and prospered through trade with Swahili, Zanzibar, Arabia, India, etc.

Mohamoud Ali Shire, who became Sultan of Warsangali at the end of the 19th century, made Las Qoray his base. However, there were several bases, and during the hot summer months, they were based in the cooler valleys in the south, away from the coast.

=== Modern ===
In 1986, executives from the American oil company Chevron visited Las Qoray at the request of the Somali government and found traces of oil.

The Somali Civil War broke out around 1988; in 1991, Somaliland declared the independence; in 1998, Puntland declared the establish. Both countries are stability relatively quickly, with Somaliland trying to expand its power to the east and Puntland to the west. The two sides engaged in a military confrontation around the Warsangali residential area (Puntland-Somaliland dispute.)

In April 2011, Puntland government arrested 16 pirates in Las Qoray.

In July 2011, a British research vessel was authorized by the Somaliland government to visit Las Khorey, but the stationed Puntland military refused.

Former president Ahmed Mohamed Mohamoud (Siilaanyo) visited the town in March 2014 along with a delegation including then Minister of Health Suleiman Haglotosiye. The restoration of Las Qoray's industries, among them its famous tuna factory, as well as the planned construction of a hospital for the town was announced during the visit.

In 2017, voter registration for the 2017 Somaliland presidential election took place throughout Somaliland, but there were no registrations from Dhahar and Las Qoray districts.

In December 2019, flooding in the Las Qoray area caused missing people and flooded and isolated roads to and from surrounding neighborhoods.

In February 2020, Somaliland's Badhan Regional Governor Mohamud Hamd Omar visited Las Khorey district with Somaliland army. The Puntland army with Ali Hussein Somali, governor of Sanaag region of Puntland, attacked it.

During the conflict between July 2021 and November 2022, Las Qoray had the largest number of exodus in Sanaag. Meanwhile, in October 2021, the Somaliland government began the forced deportation of hundreds of people they defined as "non-Somalilanders" from some areas of Sanaag. However, it is reported that Las Qoray is very unlikely to be targeted.

In March 2023, Puntland's Ministry of Fisheries and Marine Resources, in cooperation with Secure Fisheries, an agency working to develop the fishing industry, launched a Fisheries Partnership Management Program in the Las Qoray area.

== Transportation ==
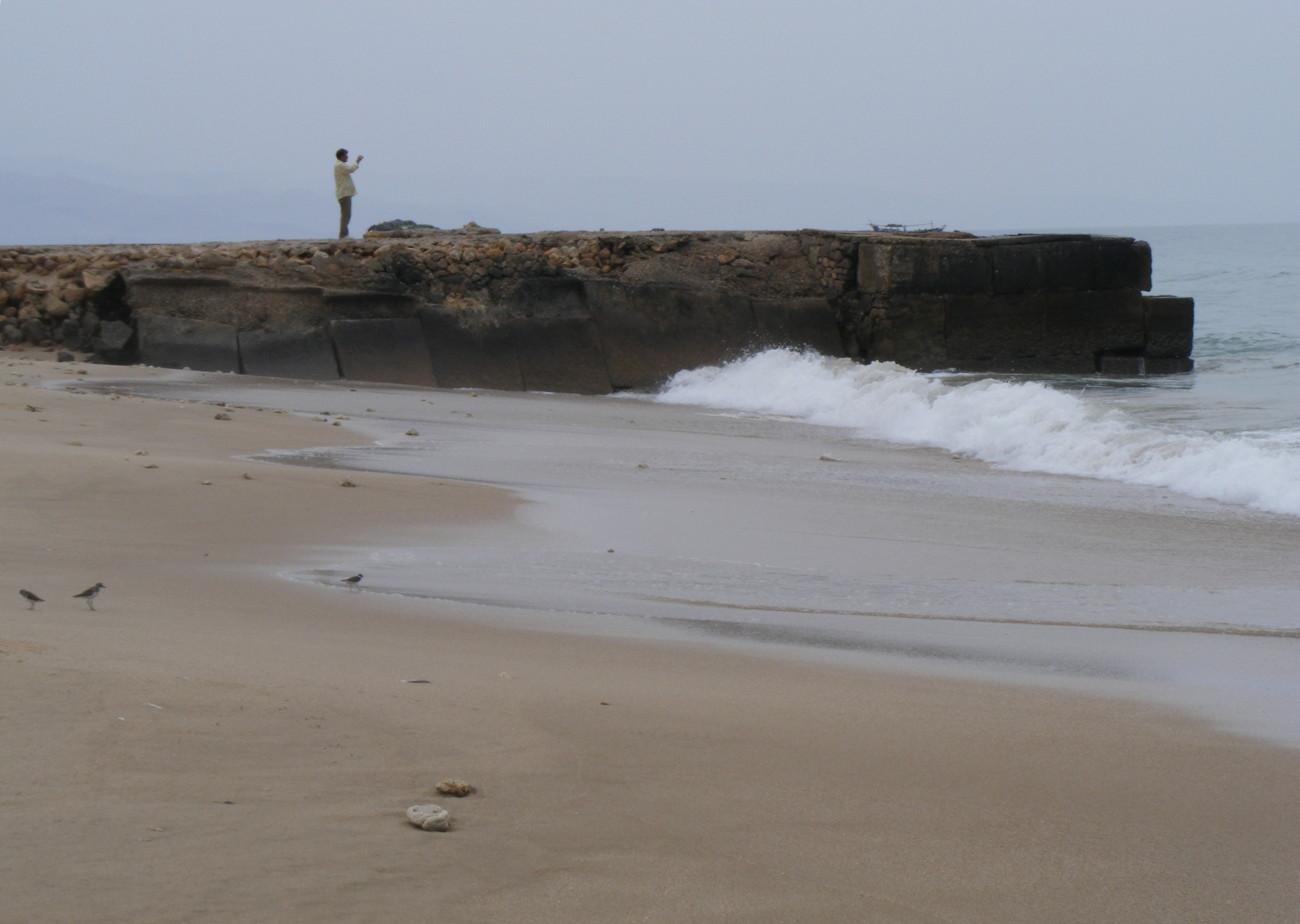
The old port in Las Qoray is undergoing extensive renovations.

Las Qoray has a jetty-class seaport, the Port of Las Qoray. Horn Relief (now Adeso), an organization founded by Somali environmentalist Fatima Jibrell, began a project for the redevelopment of the 400-year-old seaport. The initiative was later taken up by Faisal Hawar, CEO of the Maakhir Resource Company. In 2012, he brokered an agreement with a Greek investment firm for the development of the commercial Las Qoray Port. A team of engineers was subsequently enlisted by the Puntland authorities to assess the ongoing renovations taking place at the seaport. According to the Minister of Ports, Saeed Mohamed Ragge, the Puntland government intends to launch more such development projects in Las Khorey.

The nearest airport to Las Qoray is the Bender Qassim International Airport in Bosaso.

== Demographics ==
Las Qoray has a population of around 2,000 inhabitants. The broader Las Qoray area has a total population of 34,724 residents.

== Economy ==
Las Qoray has long been an exporter of livestock, fish, produce, and frankincense. On the other hand, they imported rice, wheat, sugar, clothing, etc.

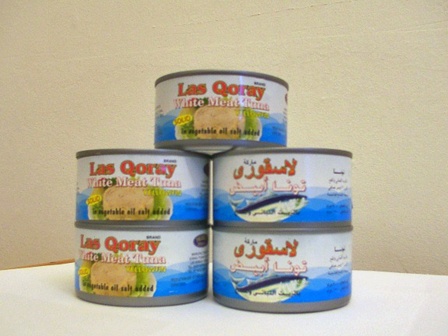
Las Qoray canned foods

Canned tuna is well known and "Las Qoray" is accepted as like a trademark. In 1970, the Somali government built a fish cannery with a pier for fishing boats, and it became a major industry in Las Qoray. In addition to tuna, shark fins are also taken for export.

The factory, which had been shut down due to the Somali civil war, reopened in 2001, but was closed shortly after. The facility was modernized and reopened in 2007. At that time, there were 2,800 fishermen and factory workers. On August 12, Hodman Trading Company, a company in Dubai, United Arab Emirates, acquired the entire plant of Las Qoray. In 2012, it was reported that they were exporting to Yemen and the United Arab Emirates. In 2019, the BBC reports that fakes are on the market. Las Qoray's cannery will remain shut down as of April 2021.

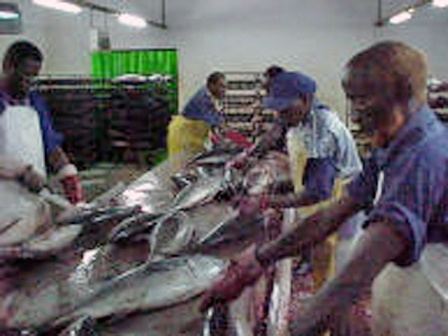
Processing fish.(2006)

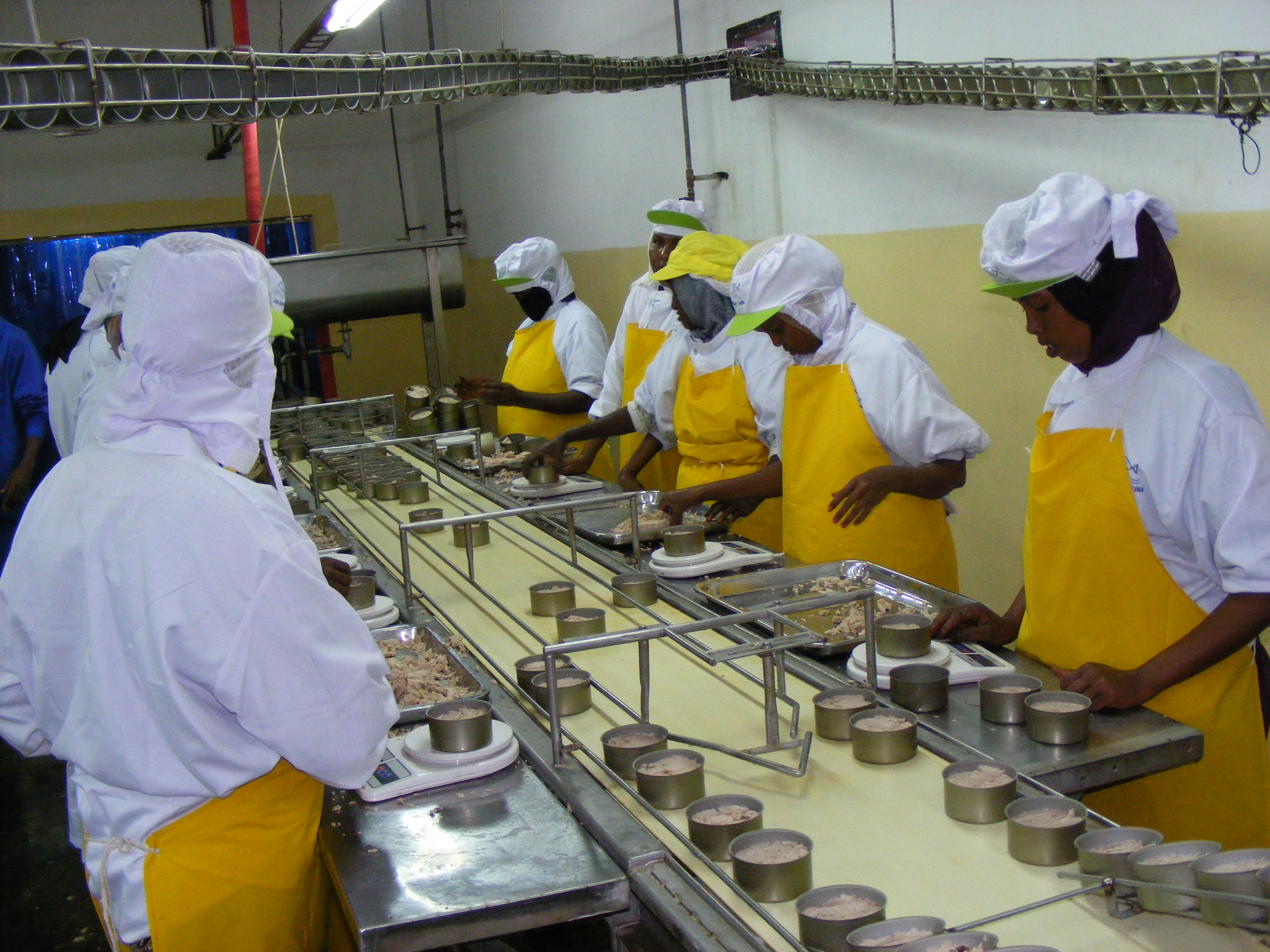
Making canned food.(2008)

== Notable Resident ==
- Farah Mohamed Jama Awl, author
