= Port of Las Khorey =

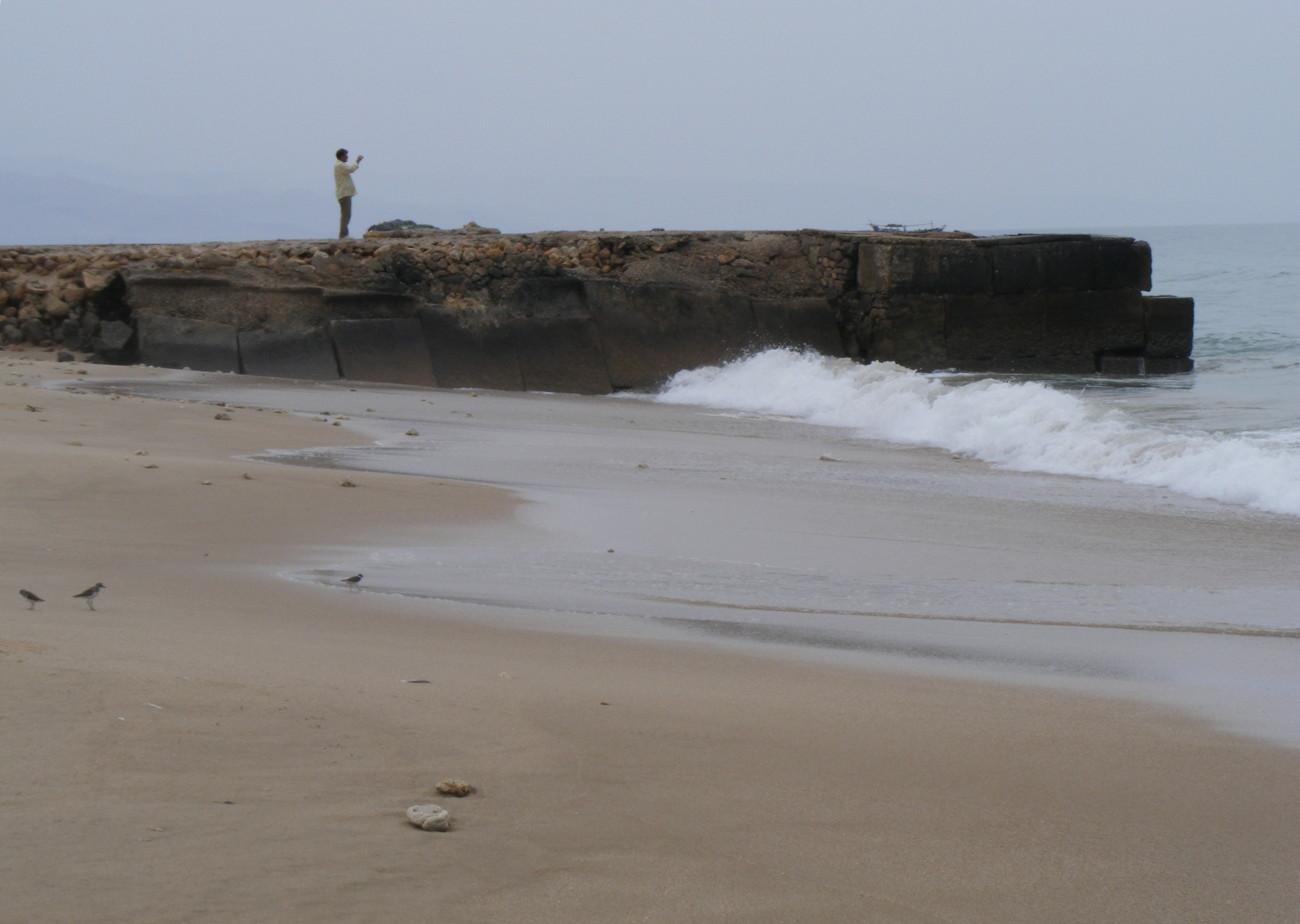
- The old Port of Las Khorey

Location
- Country: Somaliland
- Location: Las Khorey, Sanaag

The Port of Las Khorey, also known as the Las Khorey Port, is the official functioning seaport of Las Khorey, situated in Somaliland

== Overview ==
In 2012, Faisal Hawar, CEO of the Maakhir Resource Company, brokered an agreement with a Greek investment firm for the development of the commercial Las Khorey Port. A team of engineers was subsequently enlisted by the Puntland authorities to assess the ongoing renovations taking place at the seaport. According to the Minister of Ports, Saeed Mohamed Ragge, the Puntland government intends to launch more such development projects in Las Khorey.
