= Qombo'ul =

Qombo'ul Qumbucul
- Town
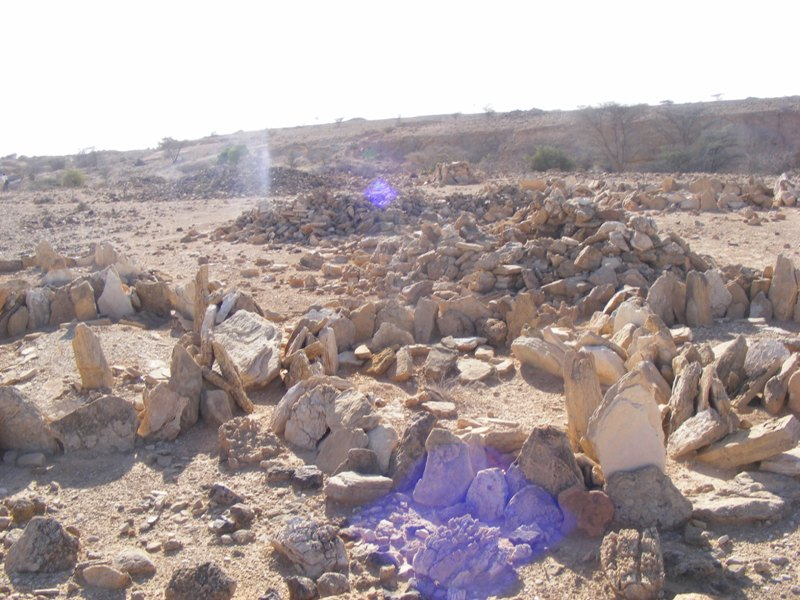
- Ancient cairns in Qombo'ul.
- Country: Somaliland
- Region: Sanaag
- District: Badhan
- Time zone: UTC+3 (EAT)

Qombo'ul (Somali: Qumbucul) is a very old and historical town in the eastern Sanaag region of Somaliland.

== Overview ==
Qombo'ul lies approximately 40 km east of Badhan, on the road to Bosaso and west of the town of Mindigale.

An old settlement that is ancient, it is the site of quite a few ancient ruins, buildings and structures, many of obscure origins. Eastern Somaliland in general is home to numerous such archaeological sites, with similar edifices found at Haylan, Qa’ableh, Maydh, Gelweita and El Ayo. However, many of these old structures have yet to be properly explored, a process which would help shed further light on local history and facilitate their preservation for posterity.

== See also ==
- Administrative divisions of Somaliland
- Regions of Somaliland
- Districts of Somaliland
- Somalia–Somaliland border
- Haylan
- Qa’ableh
- Maydh
- Gelweita
- El Ayo
