= Karinhegane =

- Archaeological site
- Location in Somaliland
- Coordinates: 11°11′N 48°13′E
- Country: Somaliland
- Region: Sanaag
- Time zone: UTC+3 (EAT)

Karinhegane is an archaeological site in the eastern Sanaag region of somaliland. It contains some unique polychrome rock art.

Karinhegane is situated between the towns of Las Khorey and El Ayo. It is the site of numerous cave paintings of real and mythical animals. Each painting has an inscription below it, which collectively have been estimated to be around 2,500 years old.

Karinhegane's rock art is in the same distinctive Somali style as the Laas Geel and Dhambalin cave paintings. Located nearby, around 25 miles from Las Khorey, is Gelweita, another key rock art site.

== See also ==
- Somaliland architecture
