= Suleiman Aden Galaydh =

Suleiman Aden Galaydh was the Darawiish military commander in the year 1903, when the Gumburu (Gumburka Cagaarweyne) and Daratoleh battles occurred. According to British sources, the number of military personnel he commanded stood at 2200, the highest battalion total for a solo commander in Darawiish history. Suleiman Aden Galaydh is also the only Darawiish commander to command three different types of military forces simultaneously, namely a cavalry, spearmen division and riflemen division. He hails from the Aden Gallaydh family, the most prominent family within the Darawiish.

Commentary from Colonel Kenna within the British War Office intimate that Suleiman Aden Galaydh's force constituted the flank of the dervish (darawiish) army: The dervish flank is usually associated with the Golaweyne division of the Darawiish, meaning that Suleiman Aden Galaydh was commander of Golaweyne.

Colonel Kenna sent parties of the tribal horse round on either side of the bush to take the enemy in the rear ... The enemy were under Suleiman Aden

British War Office reports derived from captives in the British camp state that the darawiish flank commander Suleiman Aden Galaydh commanded 2,200 troops, which consisted of three different types of military units, i.e. cavalry, riflemen and spearmen, at 200, 500, and 1500 respectively. This is the highest count of troops commanded by a single dervish commander; its also the most varied brigade commanded by a single dervish commander:

The enemy were under Suleiman Aden; their estimated strength was 500 rifles and 1,500 spears, with 200 ponies.

== Fighting style and Gumburu Agaarweyne ==
Suleiman Aden Galaydh's fighting style has been described as a line formation and as highly confident:

The enemy was formed up three deep in a line 1,500 yards long. It being found that they were in greater strength than had been expected ... The enemy were under Suleiman Aden ... The confident and determined manner in which the enemy stood their ground gives reason to hope that the Mullah will make a stand against the British advance.

The year 1903 when Suleiman Aden Galaydh was commander was the year when the battle of Gumburka Cagaarweyne, known to the British soldiers as Gumburu. This battle was described as so deadly, that random birds of prey who were dissected by their owners were found to have human remains inside:

Nin la oran jirey Maxamuud Gurey ayaa gorgorkii dooxay, waxaana calooshiisii laga soo saaray 500 oo xiniinyo rag ah. Inta dhabannada la qabsaday ayaa lays wada eegay oo waxa la yiri, ‘War maanta geyiga Soomaaliyeed wax weyn baa ka dhacay oo aan horay loo arkin bal aan war dhawrro!

Translation:

A man called Mahamud Gurey dissected an eagle. Once dissected he found the remains of 500 human testicles inside. Everyone grabbed their own cheeks surprised and looked at one another and said "Boy, it seems that the lands of the Somalis have experienced an event of an extreme magnitude that has never been seen before! Lets find out what the hell happened.

British sources agree that the Agaarweyne battle was deadly, and state that the darawiish stole all the equipment belonging to the colonialists and left every single British officer dead; the dead included the British Lieutenant general Arthur William Valentine Plunkett:

... topee and whistle had, doubtless, been taken from Gumburu’s stricken field, as also had been other articles of the Dervish equipment, such as the black cloth caps of the Yaos, the khaki puggarees of the Sikhs, and the Mannlicher cartridges belonging to the Mannlicher sporting rifle possessed by poor Johnston-Stewart, the only weapon of its kind with the force ... Plunkett, with all officers, had been cut up at Gumburu, and the Obbia force was still concentrated at Galadi.

== Aden Galaydh family ==
Suleiman Aden Galaydh hails from the notable Aden Galaydh Ducaale family, one of the most prominent families in the Darawiish. The Aden Galaydh Ducaale family was the most important dervish family during the early colonial dervish battles. They hail from the Ali Geri tribe, one of the only dervish clans whom remained loyal dervishes from the start to the end. In the poem "Doqon baan ogayn", the Sayid Mohamed, head of state of the Darawiish, compares the efforts of Aden Galaydhs offspring, the contemporaneous patriarch of the family, and by extension his offspring, with a way of life or a prophet, with the following line "Dabkuu shidayay Aw-Aaden, waa diinta Nebigiiyee", meaning the light shone by the aden galaydh family is that of a prophet or of a way of life itself.

Most of the Aden Galaydh died whilst fighting at the Jidbali battle in 1904.

One of the few survivors of this family was Saliid Baynax Aaden, Suleiman's nephew, who went on to live in Marqaanweyne from where he recounted incidents and narrations of the anti-colonial battles to the beginning of the century. The brothers Xayd and Beynax are both referred to by Sayid Mohamed Abdullah Hassan, the dervish head of state as "gaanaha" and "garaadada", the former meaning a field marshal and the latter a chieftain. This means that three of the Aden Galaydh brothers, were all dervish commanders, namely Suleiman Aden Galaydh, Xayd Aden Galaydh and Beynax Aden Galaydh.

=== Xayd Aden Galaydh ===
Suleiman Aden Galaydh wasn't the only notable figure of the Aden Galaydh family to play a major role in the Jidbali battle between the Darawiish and three colonial powers, i.e. the British, Abyssinians and Italians. His brother Xayd Aaden Galaydh was the person who had the foresight to see exactly what was going to occur and proposed moving to A place near Xudun with concealment. This was opposed by Jaamac Boos who opposed this and made the detrimental order that the dervishes have to stand their ground at all costs. This detrimental decision cost the lives of thousands of dervishes including much of the Aden Galaydh family. The suggestion Xayd Aden Galaydh made was as follows:

Jidbaale waa hannaan oo gabbaad ma lehe; aan ka kacno oo fariisanno bohosha Shimbiraley oo Ceelka Xuddun ka soo hoosaysa, bohoshaasoo labo buurood u dhaxaysa ama bohosha dhanaha Xuddun, maxaa yeelay haddii gaalku Jidbaale innaka waayo labadaas dhul midkood buu soo mari doonaa

Translation:

Jidbaale is a trap and there is no escaping nor retreating from there. Lets move from here to Shimbiraley next to Hudun or to the spot between two mountains near Xudun; the reason being is if they find us absent at Jidbali, the enemy will follow us to either of these two locations; that way we could surprise them

The suggestion made by Jaamac Boos was one that was a proponent of jihad, whilst retrospectively, that of Xayd Aden Galaydh's suggestion was one of logic, that would have allowed the anti-colonial darawiish to divert military disaster that was suffered by them at Jidbali. The description of Xayd Aden Galaydh's death at Jidbaale was especially gruesome, with accounts of his corpse being described as being scattered all over the battlefield.

=== Beynax Aden Galaydh ===
His brother Baynax Aden Galaydh is mentioned in the Indha-caadlayaal oration by the Sayid via the line "Cantallaaga lna-Aadanaa, cawro sii dhigay e" wherein he only addresses qusuusis (advisory council members), after an incident wherein they abandoned their flock in the face of an enemy resulting in besmirching commentary from the Sayid; this incident proves that Baynax Aden Galaydh was also a qusuusi. The Gudban poem tells the most extensive story about the fate of the Aden Galaydh family. The 127th line of this poem (Guxushaaga Beynaxa ilmadu, waataan gabaxleyne), is especially moving as it recounts how Beynax is near permanently sad at how three of his sons died in this battle. Beynax was the eldest of the three brothers.
