= El Ayo =

El Ayo Ceelaayo عيلايو
- Town
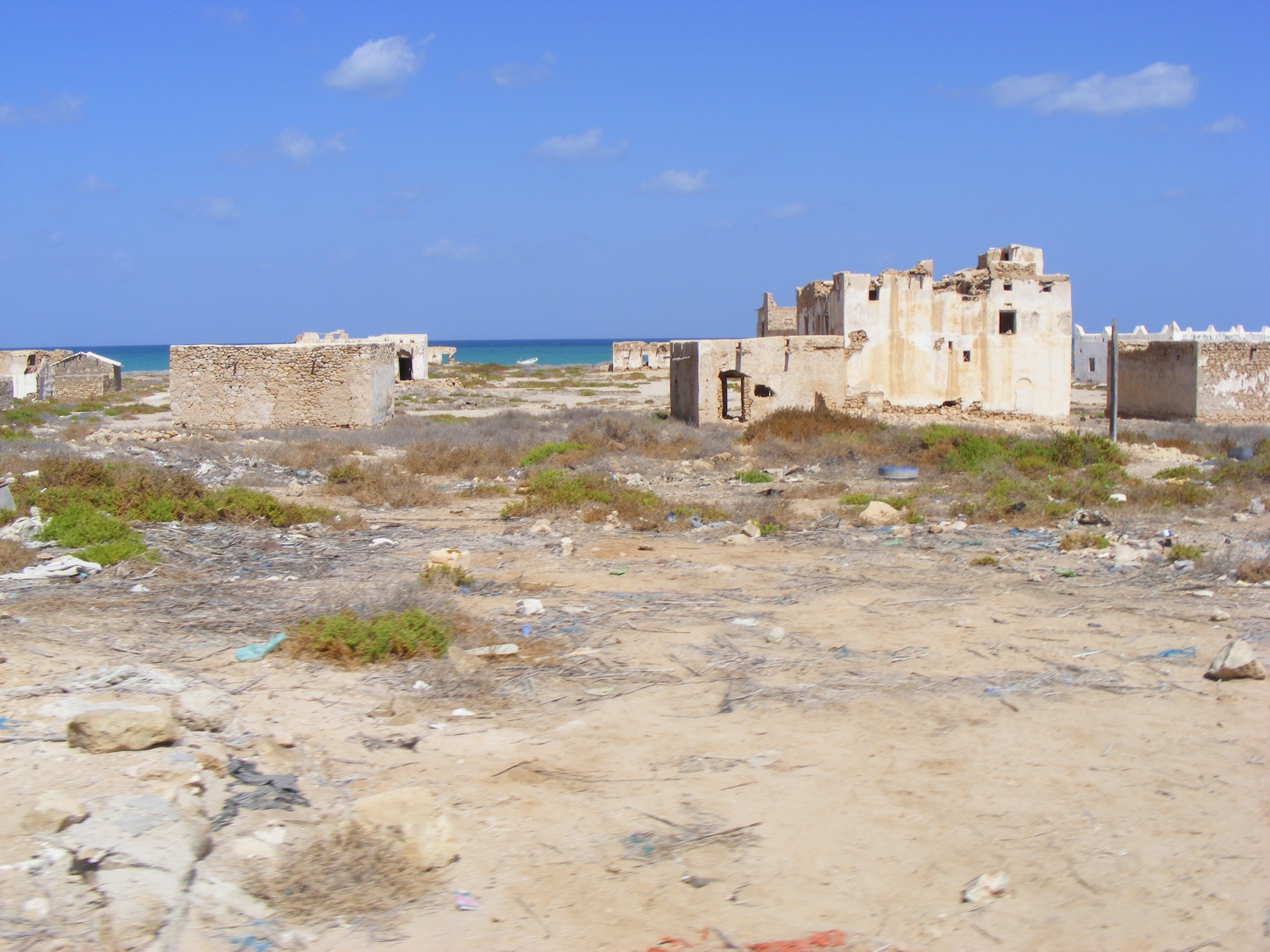
- Historic structures in El Ayo.

- Location within Sanaag Location within Somaliland
- Coordinates: 11°14′44″N 48°53′33″E
- Country: Disputed with Somaliland and Puntland
- Region: Sanaag
- District: Las Khorey
- Time zone: UTC+3 (EAT)

El Ayo (Somali: Ceelaayo, Arabic: عيلايو), also known as El Ayum, is a coastal town in the eastern Sanaag region. There is a territorial dispute between Somaliland, Puntland, and the North East State.

== Governance ==
In January 2021, a voter registration program for the Somaliland elections was launched, and since there were moves to implement it even in areas where territorial disputes with Puntland exist, it has been reported that the El Ayo district is also in a state of tension with a risk of fighting.

In March 2024, Somaliland National TV, the official broadcaster of the Somaliland government, aired footage of road construction being carried out by the local government between Las Khorey and El Ayo, showing a sign along the route that read “Republic of Somaliland – Local Government, Laas-Qoray District.”

In April 2025, the Federal Government of Somalia recognized SSC-Khatumo (now North East State) as a federal state comprising the Sool, Sanaag, and Cayn regions. However, this action faced opposition from local elders such as Sultan Siciid Sultan Abdisalan and the Puntland government.

In December 2025, a report released by the Food and Agriculture Organization of the United Nations (FAO) included a “List of non-functioning water sources” that distinguished between towns in Somaliland and Puntland; El Ayo is listed as part of Puntland, along with Badhan and other locations.

== History ==
=== Ancient times ===
El Ayo is one of a series of ancient settlements in Somaliland. About one mile from the town are the ruins of an old city, which are held to have belonged to an earlier civilization which resided in the region. Between El Ayo and Las Khorey lies Karinhegane, the site of numerous cave paintings of real and mythical animals. Each painting has an inscription below it, which collectively have been estimated to be around 2,500 years old. Around 25 miles from Las Khorey lies Gelweita, another key rock art site. Karinhegane's rock art is in the same distinctive style as the Laas Geel cave paintings.

Additionally, a number of small- to medium-sized cairns are especially concentrated on the plain that lies between the coast adjacent to El Ayo and an inland ridge around 2 km in length. Eastern Somaliland in general is home to numerous such archaeological sites, with similar edifices found at Haylan, Qa’ableh, Qombo'ul and Maydh. However, many of these old structures have yet to be properly explored, a process which would help shed further light on local history and facilitate their preservation for posterity.

El Ayo was also an early local hub of Islam, with the religion spreading through maritime enterprise.

=== British Somaliland ===
However, during the period of British Somaliland, the coastal settlements in this area gradually declined. This is because modern port facilities were built in places such as Berbera and Djibouti, and the British moved their administrative center to the cooler inland areas.

=== After the Somali Civil War ===
Since 2008, al-Shabaab, which used to be active in southern Somalia, has moved into the area, and in northern Somalia, it is believed to be based in the mountainous areas around Bosaso and El Ayo.

In February 2012, a ship that had sunk off the coast of El Ayo was found on the coast of Cadcado, 70 kilometers from Las Qoray.

In November 2013, a major cyclone hit the El Ayo area, damaging many coastal boats and about 100 sheep.

In February 2016, the Puntland Navy arrested an arms smuggler based in El Ayo.

According to a July 2017 report, there is a constant flow of illegal migrants from Somalia's northern coast to Yemen on the other side of the river, but El Ayo is considered unpopular due to the presence of an airport and Puntland Maritime Police Force base along the road.

In August 2018, Puntland Security Force provide supplies to El Ayo.

In December 2019, the surrounding area, including El Ayo, met with flooding.

In October 2020, Puntland security forces seized a boat belonging to an arms smuggler based off the coast of Rascaley, El Ayo, and Cadcad.

In January 2021, the Somaliland government attempted to conduct voter registration in preparation for elections in the Sanaag region, including El Ayo, but the government of Puntland announced that it would oppose the attempt with force.

In March 2021, the Puntland Maritime Police Force conducted a crackdown along the northern coast of Somalia, including El Ayo, seizing 10 boats and arresting their crews for illegal fishing by Yemenis.

In August 2021, Puntland security forces attacked Al-Shabaab, which was based in the nearby mountainous region of El Ayo and other areas, and destroyed their strongholds.

== See also ==
- Haylan
- Qa’ableh
- Qombo'ul
- Maydh
