= Faisal Hawar =

Somali Entrepreneur (born 1963)

Faisal Hawar فيصل هوار
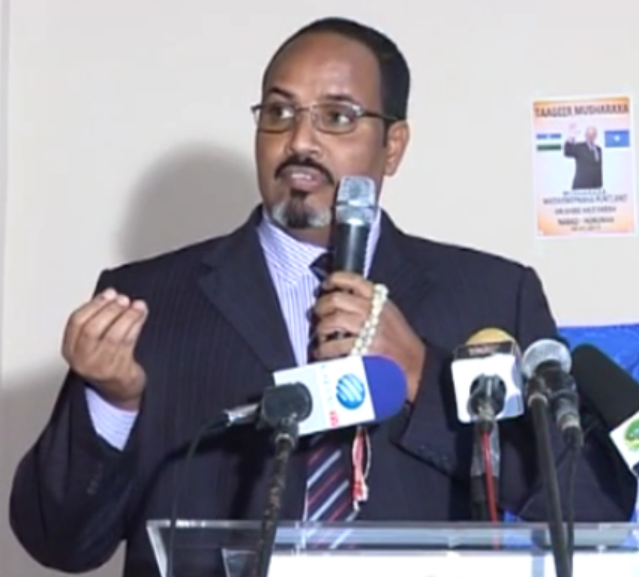
- Born: 1963 (age 62–63); Aden, Yemen
- Education: University of Pune; Aligarh Muslim University; SCOTVEC
- Occupation: Entrepreneur
- Title: Chairman of International Somalia Development Foundation, CEO of Maakhir Resource Company

Faisal Ahmed Yusuf "Hawar" (Somali: Faisal Xawaar, Arabic: فيصل هوار) (born 1963) is a Somali Entrepreneur. He is the CEO/President and co-founder of the International Somalia Development Foundation as well as the Maakhir Resource Company.

== Personal life ==
Hawar was born Faisal Ahmed Yusuf in 1963 in Aden, Yemen. His family hails from the Las Khorey area in the northern Sanaag region of Somalia, a stronghold of the Warsangali sub-clan of the Harti Darod. Faisal's father, the late Haji Hawar, was a prominent middle manager with BP based in Yemen.

For his early education, Hawar attended school in Mogadishu, situated in the south-central Banaadir region of Somalia. He pursued his undergraduate studies abroad, earning a bachelor's degree in Statistics, Economics and Operation Research from the University of Pune in Maharashtra, India in 1987. Hawar followed that in 1989 with a master's degree in Statistics, Operations Research and Computer Programming from the Aligarh Muslim University in Aligarh, India. In 1993, he also earned a Postgraduate Diploma in Business Computing from the Scottish Vocational Education Council in Edinburgh, Scotland.

== Career ==
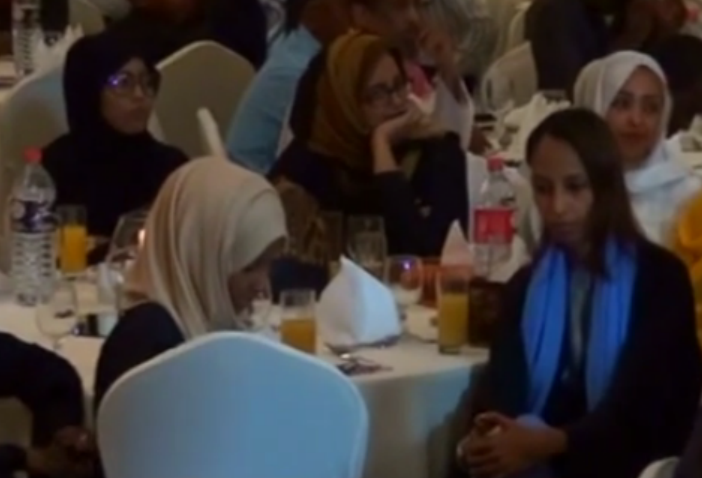
Somali women at a political function in Dubai chaired by Faisal Hawar.

Hawar began his career in 1991 as a Computer Systems Quality Controller with Etisalat, the leading telecommunications firm in the United Arab Emirates. In 1998, he became the Head of IT Operations for the Abu Dhabi Islamic Bank, which at the time was just starting up. Hawar joined the Etisalat Group's Thuraya Satellite Telecommunication Company the following year. As the firm's Chief Information Officer between 2007-2008, he led five sub-departments, a staff of 89, and managed a total Capex/Opex of US$30 million. He later served as the Chief Information Office/Director of IT for Etisalat's Zanzibar Telecom division.

Hawar provides advisory services to various governmental agencies. He has also started a number of consultancy companies, which have helped secure memoranda of understanding between public and private entities. Additionally, Hawar has been a leader in attracting foreign direct investment in Somalia. To this end, through his Makhir Resource Company, he brokered an agreement in 2012 with a Greek investment firm for the development of the commercial Port of Las Khorey.

Hawar is also engaged within the political system in Somalia. Under President Abdullahi Yusuf Ahmed's incumbency, Hawar facilitated the signing of a US$1 billion agreement at the FOCAC. He later supported Shire Haji Farah's candidacy during the autonomous northeastern Puntland region's 2014 presidential elections. While serving as Puntland's representative to Kuwait, Hawar likewise oversaw an agreement in Dubai between the Puntland government and a Kuwaiti company for the development of facilities at the Garowe International Airport and Maakhir University. The deal was valued at $10 million and was financed by the Kuwait Fund for Arab Economic Development (KFAED). In October 2013, Puntland Minister of Finance Farah Ali Jama and KFAED Deputy Director Hamad Al-Omar signed a follow-up Grant Agreement in Kuwait. The pact will see the Fund extend $10 million, of which $6 million will be allocated to finance the Garowe Airport Project and the remainder will be earmarked for the Maakhir University Project.

== Awards ==
In 2013, Hawar was named Person of the Year by Somali Public Radio in recognition of his entrepreneurial and leadership work.
