= Dobira =

Dobira دومبرة
- Mother of all Darod clans
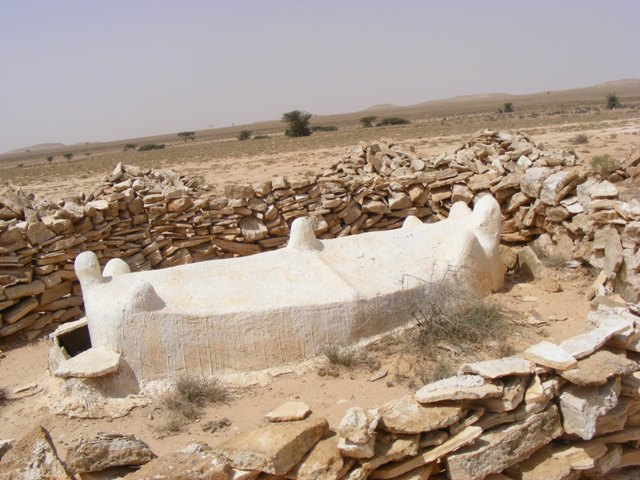
- Burial place of Dombira near Haylaan, Somalia
- Religion: Islam

Dombiro (Arabic: دُومبِرَ بِنت دَغَالَ), was a Somali historical figure known for being the wife of the progenitor of the Darod clan, Sheikh Abdulrahman al-Jabarti.

== Biography ==
During the 10th CE, Dombiro married Sheikh Abdirahman bin Isma'il al-Jabarti (Darod), a son of the Sufi Sheikh Isma'il al-Jabarti of the Qadiriyyah order, who had settled in Somaliland just across the Red Sea. The union is said to have given rise to the Darod clan family.

Dombiro was the daughter of Dagale (Dikalla), the Dir clan chief at the time. By marrying Dombiro, Darod established links with the Samaale stem. However, the origin of Dombiro is disputed, some say she was from another background, such as Harla. Some sources state the early people to whom Dombiro belonged to were the Harla who are said to have lived in the region before the arrival of Somalis.

Dombiro is buried just outside the ancient town of Haylaan in the Sanaag region of Somaliland where Sheikh Darod's tomb is also located.

== See also ==
- Sheikh Ishaaq
