= Gudban =

1907 poem by Somali leader Muhammad Abdullah Hassan

- by Muhammad Abdullah Hasan
- Country: Dervish
- Language: Somali

Gudban is a 1907 poem and oration by Muhammad Abdullah Hassan, the leader of the darawish, announcing his policy declaration. It was one of many orations and poems which were salvaged after Maxamed Aadan Sheekh, Somalia's Minister of Culture ordered for them to be salvaged, but only permitted poems which were memorized by former members of the Haroun (darawish government). The Gudban poem in particular, was transmitted in 1957 by the darawish veteran Garaad Soofe Durraan. The darawish referred to the poem as Gaala leged, which could be translated from Somali to English as Defeating the Infidels. Non-darawish Somalis referred to the poem as Gudban, which is a Somali word that literally means "moving across". This was in reference to how during the year it was released, the darawish moved back into their old territories in the Nugaal Valley.

Whereas Muhammad Abdullah Hassan is the most notable poet in Somali history, Gaala Leged or Gudban is itself arguably his most memorable poem. Said Sheikh Samatar described Gudban as a political poem and "policy declaration and proclamation of edicts", which was in nature, similar to a State of the Union address.

== Purpose ==
Mursal Farah Afdub and Lidwien Kapteijns argued that the aggressiveness of the poem derives from the limitations of the Illig agreement which confined their territories and ambitions. As such, the Sayid and his darawish were motivated to once again return to warfare as was the state of affairs between 1900 and 1904. The gudban poem was the induction which marked this shift in darawish strategy and the onset of the return to warfare.

== Components ==
According to Mursal Farah Afdub and Lidwien Kapteijns, there are seven components to the Gudban poem. The first part (1 to 6) discusses conveyance, the second (7 – 33) is about his rage, the third (34 – 45) is one of boasting, the fourth (46 – 75) explains why the Sayid seeks to take up arms again, the fifth (76 – 96) he mentions some tribes as colonial collaborators and thus puts them in his crosshairs, the sixth (97 – 110) is the Sayid describing how he's gifted at various fields, and the seventh (111 – 153) he describes how certain Dhulbahante subclans have been annihilated at the hands of the colonialists. In the 106th verse, the Sayid claims to speak on behalf of the contemporaneous supreme garaad of the Ciid-Nugaal Diiriye Guure; suggesting that the Sayid considered the Dhulbahante chieftain Diiriye Guure as holding a more senior rank within the Darawiish than himself.

=== First ===
The first component is from line one to line seven. In the first component the Sayid ascribes his return to aggressive forms of poetry to sleepless nights, especially verse 1 and 3. He triumphantly celebrates the death or downfall of an aristocratic foe called Guray Shirwac of the Majeerteen Sultanate and uses anthropomorphic metaphors such as describing hyenas as tendentiously feasting on the corpses of anti-darawiish forces.

=== Second ===
In the second component, the Sayid discusses his rage towards the aristocrats, notables and royalty of the eastern princely states, namely, the Majeerteen Sultanate and Hobyo Sultanate, and his disdain for their betrayal and ungratefulness despite the gifts he has given, such as the horse Xiin Faniin, such as in verse 7. For example, he mocks Ahmed Taajir, the brother of King Cismaan of the Majeerteen Sultanate. Ahmed Taajir used to rule over Bosaso. In section two he also puts forth moral stances, such as describing being treasonousness as being worthy of a death sentence.

=== Third ===
The third component is line 34 until line 45. The third component discusses the Sayid boasting about himself and his eloquence, such as verses 34 to 35. In this component of the oration, he also uses imagery and agronomy-related parables in line with nature and in order to appeal to his most likely base of support: the nomadic pastoralists.

=== Fourth ===
The fourth component discusses why the Sayid is seeking to declare war and renege on the Illig treaty, such as verses 47, 67 and 68. Through the various messengers who would amplify his orations and poems across the Somali peninsula, in this component he also seeks to form a personal connection between himself and his fellow Somalis by describing his own personality and state of mind to them. In this section he speaks affectionately about Dhooddi, his fastest and one of his favorite horses which was gifted to him by Xirsi Cartan Boos, the man who would later go on to kill Richard Corfield.

=== Fifth ===
In the fifth component is where the Sayid suggests that the Hagar Aadan (Ararsame subclan), East (Majeerteen), Isaaq and Ogaden tribes were colonial collaborators, and as such has them in his crosshairs, in verses 81, 85 and 88. He at times uses intensifiers and vulgar language as an indication of the critical importance of his anti-imperialist cause.

=== Sixth ===
The 6th component, the Sayid says he's accomplished and skilled, such as in verse 99. As such, it also shows his self-awareness of the charm that permitted him to rule over such as vast area. He also describes himself as generous and therefore enticing others to join him financially, militarily or in spirit. In this section, he insists that his quest of anti-imperialism and self-determination are more dignified than the docile, submissive and subservient stance towards colonialists by his foes. He alludes to his age-derived wisdom by alluding to his seniority and via his recollection of the Gaaddaweyn drought of the 19th century.

=== Seventh ===
In the seventh component, in the first part, the Sayid mentions several darawiish leaders called gaanaha (meaning commanders) and garaaddada (meaning chieftains) whom experienced casualties in the darawiish-colonial wars of the preceding six years, namely: (a) Xasan Gaagguf Axmed Mulac (b) Xayd Aaden Gallaydh (c) Xirsiwaal Maxamuud Cashuur (d) Maxamuud Dheri (e) Beynax Aaden-Gallaydh (f) Muuse Taagane (g) Guuleed Caligeri Axmed and (h) Aadan Seed. In the second part, the Sayid laments being oppressed by the Abyssinian, British and Italian colonialists, and their Somali collaborators and mentions several Dhulbahante subclans who had been annihilated by colonial forces. In the end of the oration, the Sayid makes a supplication to God, seeking to overcome his enemies, as with verse 143:
