= Qaʽableh =

Archaeological site in Somaliland

Qaʽableh Qacableh
- Town
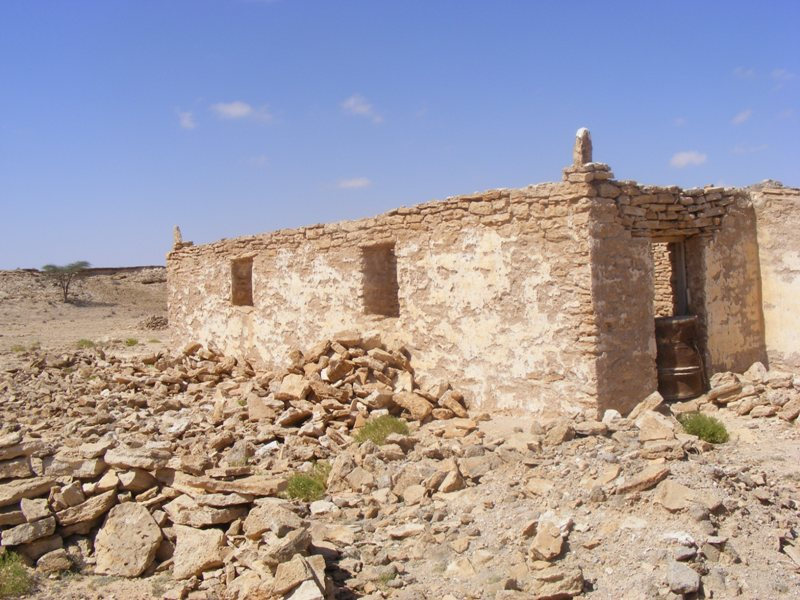
- Sheikh Harti's tomb in Qaʽableh.

- Location in Somaliland
- Coordinates: 10.5712°N 47.4523°E
- Country: Somaliland
- Region: Sanaag
- Time zone: UTC+3 (EAT)

Qaʽableh (Somali: Qacableh) is a town in the eastern Sanaag region of Somaliland. It is the site of numerous archaeological sites and ancient tombs.

== Overview ==
Qa'ableh is located near the historical ruins of Haylan. An ancient city, it is home to numerous archaeological sites and structures, similar to those found in Qombo'ul and El Ayo, two other old towns in east Somalia. Most of these historical sites have still yet to be fully explored.

Qa'ableh also notably serves as the seat of the tomb of Harti, the founding father of the Harti confederation of Darod sub-clans who was killed in a battle. Sheikh Darod's grave is situated nearby in the Hadaaftimo Mountains, and is the scene of frequent pilgrimages.

The town is believed to harbor the tombs of former kings from early periods of Somali history, as evidenced by the many ancient burial structures and cairns (taalo) that are found scattered within this region.

== Historical tombs ==
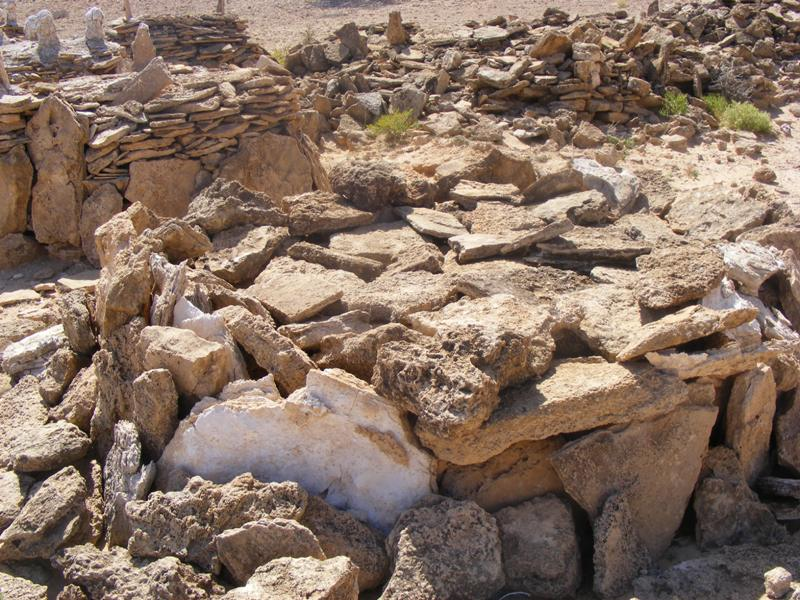
Ruins of Qa'ableh in Sanaag, Somaliland

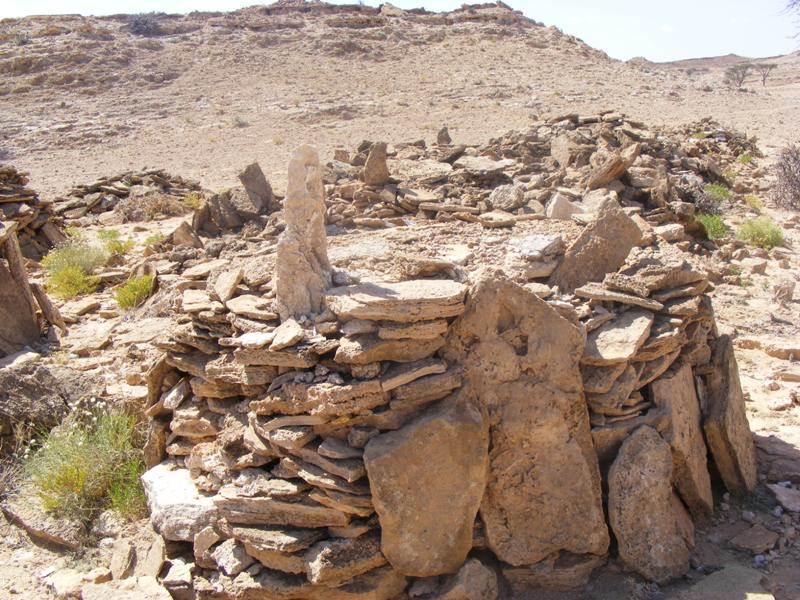
Unknown grave in Qa'ableh, Sanaag, Somaliland

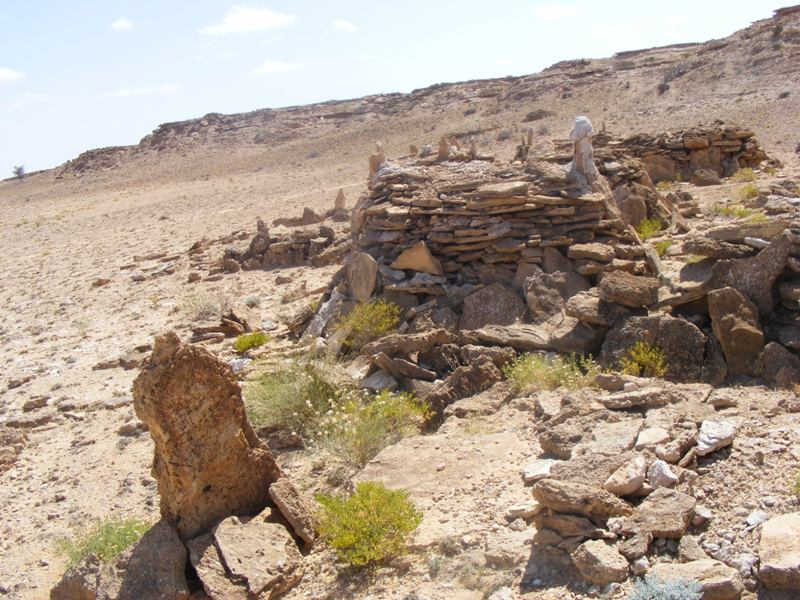
Ruins at Qa'ableh, Sanaag, Somaliland

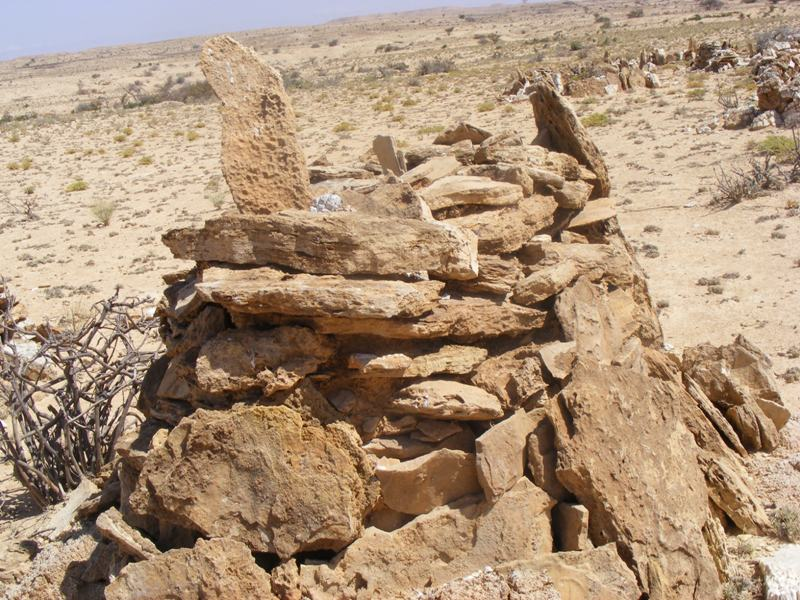
Another unknown grave in Qa'ableh, Sanaag, Somaliland

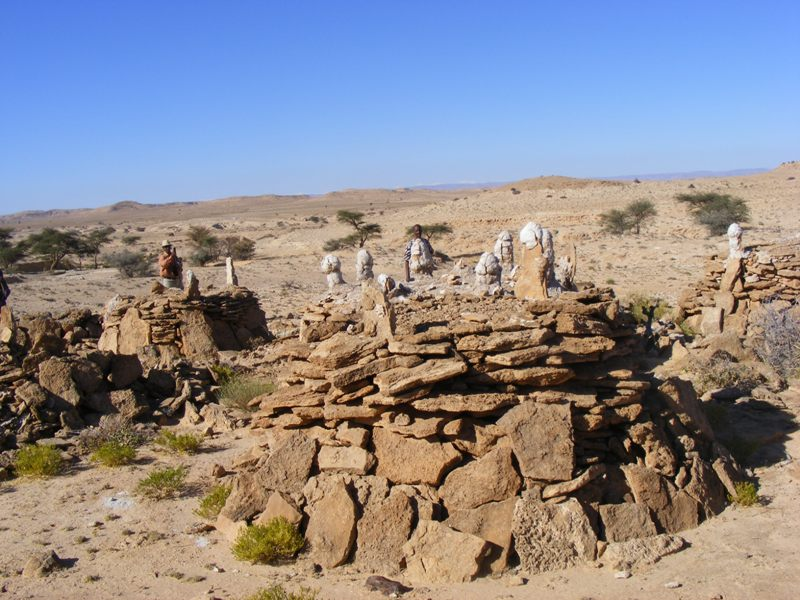
Ancient cairns in Qa'ableh, Sanaag, Somaliland

== See also ==
- Administrative divisions of Somaliland
- Regions of Somaliland
- Districts of Somaliland
- El Ayo
- Haylan
- Qombo'ul
- Maydh
