= Haylan =

Haylan هيلان
- Town
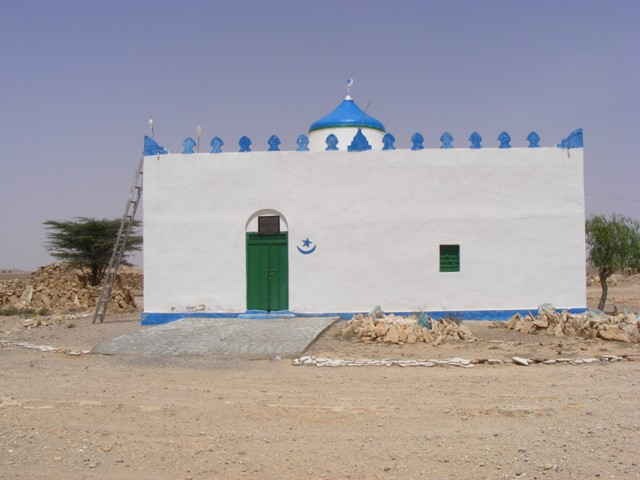
- Tomb of Sheikh Darod, the founding father of the Darod clan, in Haylan.

- Location in Somaliland Haylan (Somaliland)
- Coordinates: 10°43′25″N 48°11′27″E
- Country: Somaliland
- Region: Sanaag
- District: Badhan
- Elevation: 1,324 m (4,344 ft)
- Time zone: UTC+3 (EAT)

Haylan (Somali: Heylaan), is a town in the eastern Sanaag region of Somaliland.

== Overview ==
An old settlement, Haylan is the site of numerous ancient ruins and buildings, many of obscure origins. Northeastern Somalia in general is home to numerous such archaeological sites. However, many of these old structures have yet to be properly explored, a process which would help shed further light on local history and facilitate their preservation for posterity.

Located near Badhan, the town is also where Sheikh Darod, the founding father of the Darod clan, lived and was buried. Sheikh Darod's wife, Dobira, is also buried here.

In September 2018, Puntland President Abdiweli Gaas visited the Tomb of Sheikh Darod.

== See also ==
- Administrative divisions of Somaliland
- Regions of Somaliland
- Districts of Somaliland
- Somalia–Somaliland border
- El Ayo
- Qa’ableh
- Qombo'ul
- Maydh
