= Gelweita =

Gelweita Geel Wayta
- Archaeological site
- Location in Somaliland Gelweita (Somaliland)
- Coordinates: 11.100°N 47.910°E
- Country: Somaliland
- Region: Sanaag
- District: Erigavo
- Time zone: UTC+3 (EAT)

Gelweita (Somali: Geel Wayta), also known as Las Galwayta or Galwayta, is an archaeological site and a key rock art site in the eastern Sanaag region of Somaliland.

== Overview ==
Gelweita is at an altitude of 7500ft and is near a plateau. The archeological site is approximately 40km or 25 miles west of Las Khorey. The site dates back thousands of years and is evidence of an earlier stone-age culture that inhabited the area.

John Hanning Speke, an English explorer who made an exploratory expedition to the area in an attempt to reach the Nugaal Valley, described the site:

The harbours are, generally speaking, open and shallow road-steads, where ships find no protection; there is, however, one place (Las Galwayta), where, it is said, deep water extends to the shore. Meteorological observations show a moderate temperature, clear air, and a regular north-easterly wind. It is probable that, unlike the Berberah Plain, the monsoon rain here falls in considerable quantities. This land belongs in part to the muuse Ismail subclan-Habaryunis. Westwards of Las Galwayta, which is the frontier, the warsangeli lay claim to the coast. The two tribes, as usual in that unhappy land, are on terms of "Dam" or blood-feud; yet they intermarry. The animals observed were, the Waraba, a darkcoloured cynhyena, with a tail partly white, a grey jackal, and three different kinds of antelopes. Besides gulls, butcher birds, and a description of sparrow, no birds were found on the Maritime Plain.

— Sir Richard Francis Burton, First Footsteps in East Africa, Or, An Exploration of Harar

He also remarked the favourable position that Gelweita lies in for a potential Somali settlement, the area belongs to Idarays- Muse Ismail Sub-calan of Habar garhejis.

On the way from Bunder Jedid to Las Kuray, Lieutenant Speke remarks that Las Galwayta would be a favourable site for a Somali settlement. The water is deep even close to the shore, and there is an easy ascent from it to the summit of the mountains. The consequence is that it is coveted by the Warsingali, who are opposed by the present proprietors, the Habr Gerhajis. The Sultan of the former family resists any settlement for fear of dividing and weakening their force; it is too far from their pastures, and they have not men enough for both purposes.

— Sir Richard Francis Burton, First Footsteps in East Africa, Or, An Exploration of Harar

== Demographics ==
The area serves as the frontier between the Habr Yunis sub-division of the Garhajis Isaaq and the Warsangeli sub-division of the Harti Darod.

== See also ==
- Administrative divisions of Sanaag, Somaliland
- Country of Somaliland
- Districts of Las-gorey
- Somaliland–Somaliland border
