= Warsangali =

Somali clan

Warsangali ورسنجلي
- Darod Somali Clan
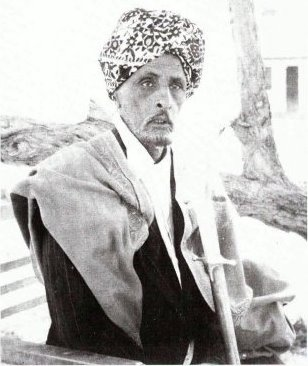
- Portrait of Mohamoud Ali Shire, the 20th Sultan of the Somali Sultanate of Warsangali.
- Ethnicity: (Somalia) Somali
- Location: (Somalia) Somalia (Yemen) Yemen; Oman
- Descended from: Abdirahman bin Isma'il al-Jabarti
- Parent tribe: Harti
- Language: (Somalia) Somali (Arab League) Arabic
- Religion: Sunni Islam

The Warsangali (Somali: Warsangeli, Arabic: ورسنجلي), alternatively the Mohamoud Harti, are a major Somali sub clan, part of the larger Harti branch, which belongs to the Darod clan, one of the largest Somali tribe families. In the Somali language, the name Warsangali means "bringer of good news." The Warsangali primarily inhabit the Sanaag.

== Overview ==
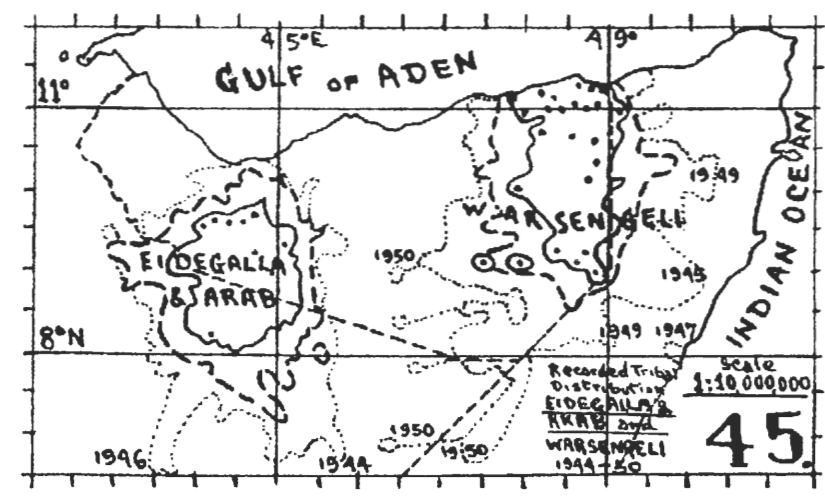
Map of Somalia showing distribution of the Warsangali tribe in the north eastern Somalia

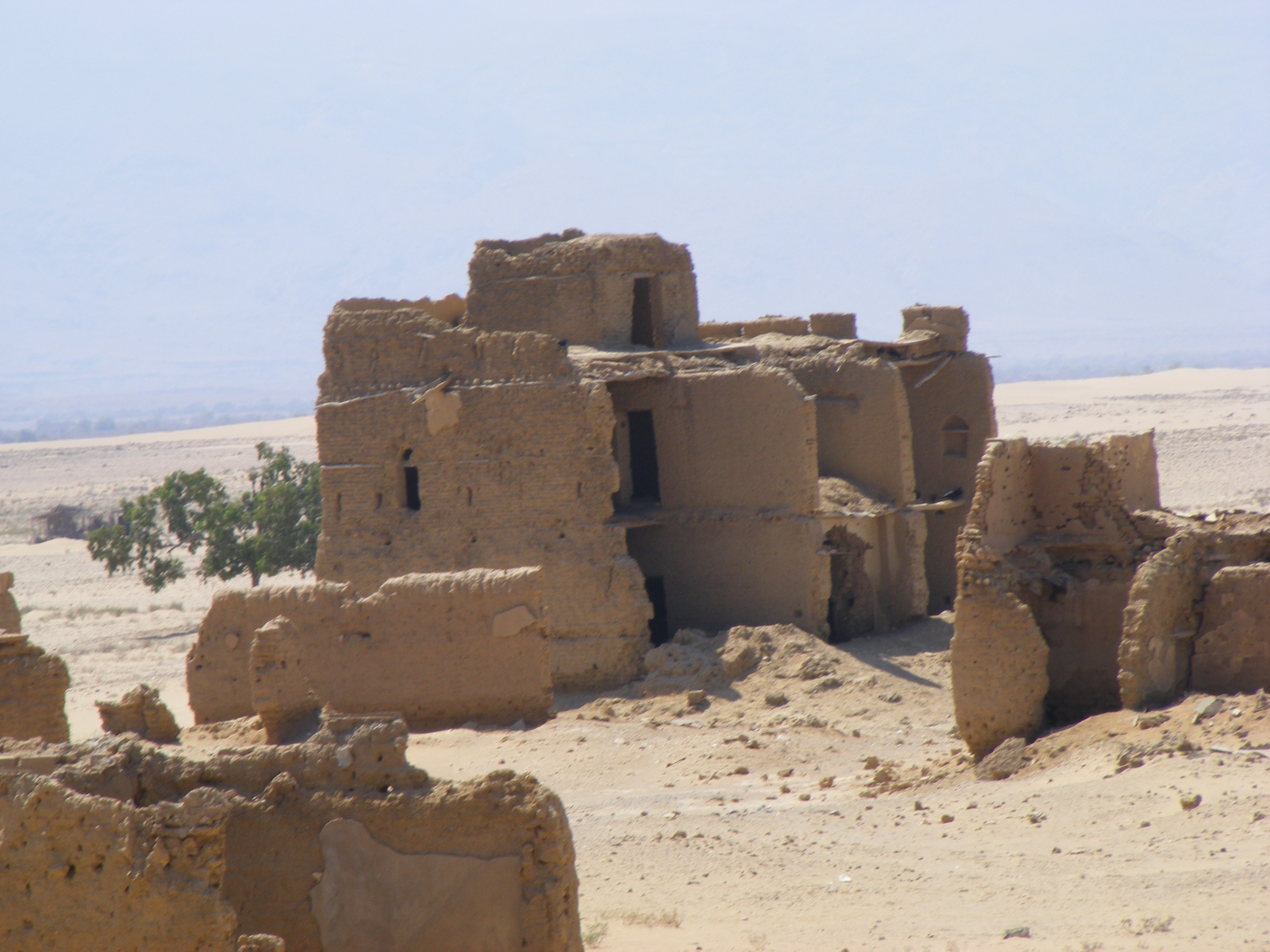
Ruins in the coastal town of Las Khorey

In 1848, C. J. Cruttenden reported that the Warsangali and Majeerteen territories were the most commercially valuable in the Nugaal Valley and that Banians from India had become successful exporters. The Cal Madow chain of mountains, which is partially inside the clan's territory, extends to the cities of Bosaso (the capital of the Bari region) and Ceerigaabo (the capital of the Sanaag region) both in an east and west direction.

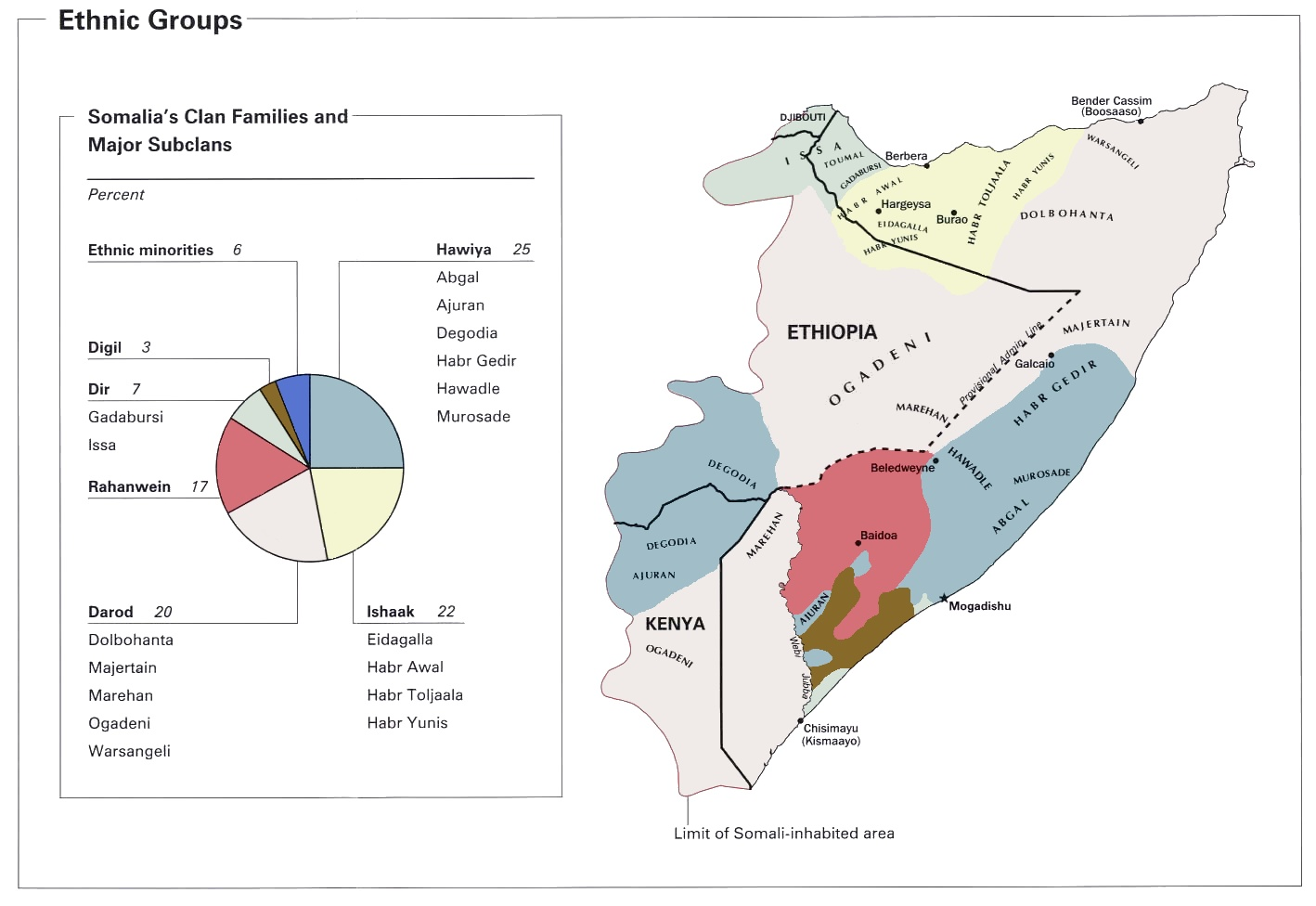
Traditional territory inhabited by the various Somali clans shown

An article titled "Seychellois Rekindle Ties with Sultan of Somaliland," which was featured in one of the newspapers of the Republic of Seychelles, writes, "the Warsengeli Sultanate has been in existence for the last hundred six hundred years."

=== Indian Ocean diplomacy ===
The Warsangali Sultanate placed a value on maintaining diplomatic ties with rulers in Europe and South Arabia, as evidenced by archival files in Arabic text containing such correspondence. John Hanning Speke wrote that when he visited the Warsangeli country in 1855, “the United Kingdom would hold the Sultan Mohamed (21st Sultan) accountable” if his safety were compromised. Lidwien and Spaulding (2002) described two documents that signify how the Sultanate administered its affairs and guarded its independence. Lidwien and Spaulding mention a laissez-passer document issued by Sultan Mohamed to a French physician, Gerges Revoil, on 12 December 1889. The laissez-passer instructs the French to observe the protocol of entering the country. Any foreign visitor or dignitary would enter the Warsangeli country via its sea port of Las Qoray. However, given the traveler's unfamiliarity with the established rules and customs of the land, the sultan allowed the French to enter by land through Bandar Mura’aya.

=== The Conquest of Abyssinia ===
In the Adal chronicler Futuh al-Habasha, Sihab ad-Din, who was an eyewitness in many of the battles to conquer Abyssinia, compares the 300 Harti army to an Arab knight whose name was Hamzah al-Jufi:

“On the left was the Somali tribe of [Warsangeli] Harti, from the people of Mait (Sanaag); a people not given to yielding. There were three hundred (300) of them, famous among the infantry as stolid as swordsmen.....One of the Arabs called Hamzah al-Jufi engaged in a battle to the death in front of the Imam of the Muslims. He was one of the footsoldiers and stood his ground and stood the test, confronting war with a full heart. He never struck one infidel whom he did not unhorse, dead. He killed so vast a number of them in the middle of the river, that the river water was turned red by the blood. The whole tribe of Harti was like him" (Sihab ad Din, p. 78).

== History ==
Today, the influence of Sultans and other traditional leaders has waned with the advent of independence and the establishment of a central government in Somalia that exercises national sovereignty. However, the longest surviving Muslim sultanate ever established in the Somali peninsula is the Warsangali Sultanate. It has been in existence for the last six hundred years.

The Warsangali Sultanate has a history of civilization, characterized by a defined population and territory, along with an organized political structure. The Warsangeli inhabit a territory extending to the west of Erigavo from Bosaso (Bari region), straddling from the shore of Laaso Suurad, (“Ras Surad”), and bordered in the North by the Gulf of Aden to the plateaus of Sool Haud (a land mass the size of Sool and Awdal regions combined).

The Sultanate produced seafarers who made their mark in the field of social science. Ibrahim Isma’il's book, An Early Autobiography of a Somali (1919), a Warsangeli seafarer himself, describes a judgment issued by the Sultan and in compliance with a decision by the royal court. The sultan ordered a boat-making project as a redress to an incident at the port. To maintain the region's trade ties with the Arabian peninsula, the Sultan ruled that preserving its integrity as a place where traders have guarantees for the value and protection of their merchandise was important. Murrayat's travels (1848) in the interior of the Warsangeli Country shows a similar observation. Murrayat observed a widespread practice of good moral precepts in safeguarding the rights of private property and in deference to the law of the land. During his stay, not an article of his belongings was stolen. He states, “In this land, to call a man a thief is a deadly insult only to be washed by blood alone.”

Until 1920, the sultanate had maintained its independence after its sultan, Mohamoud Ali Shire, was exiled into the islands of Seychelles. The sultan was fiercely independent and detested foreign presence in his country. A newspaper as cited by Seychelles Nation, states, “His independent policy, strength and indifference to the powers surrounding him, including the British has vexed London and led to his arrest and deportation to Seychelles.

The Sultan was described as a sovereign ruler of immense influence and a man of mercurial image by the historian I.M. Lewis. He was the 24th sultan in a long line of Gerads (a Somali royal court). In 1920, the sultan was exiled along with the two African Kings, King Prempeh of Ashanti (Ghana) and king Kabarego of Bunyoro (Uganda), and a former Prime Minister of Egypt, Sa'ad Zaghlul Pasha, as well as other luminaries of leaders in the wars of African resistance to the British colonialism were also there as exiles. He was the descendent of a six-hundred-year-old tradition (please see ‘What led to the discovery of the Nile’ by John Hanning Speke). In the 1940 and 50s, the Warsangeli leadership formed the United Somali Party (USP) following a three-month convention chaired by the Sultan himself following his return from exile. The USP was instrumental in Somalia's long and painful road to freedom and independence from colonial powers.

== Lineage ==
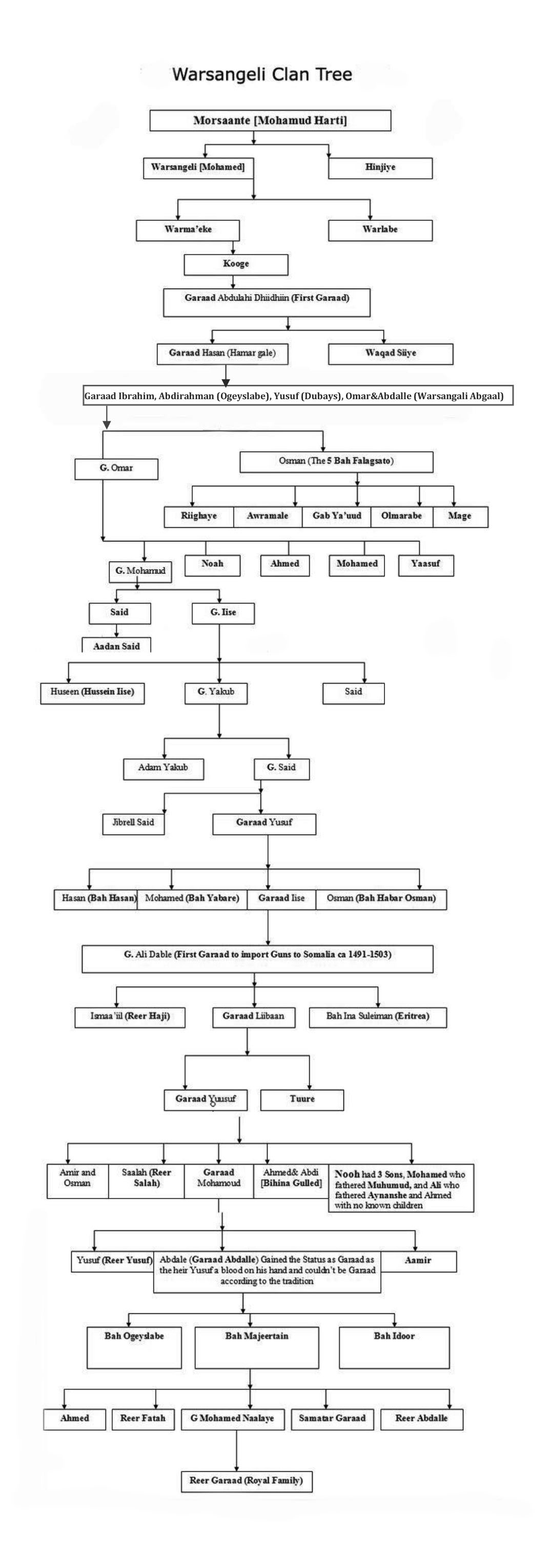
The full clan Tree of Warsnageli Harti Darod

The structures of the clans and sub clans are not clearly agreed upon. The divisions and subdivisions as they are presented here are condensed and incomplete. Numerous lineages are absent. See the African Royal family groups for a comparison of several perspectives on clan-lineage formations.

- Mohamoud Harti (Moorsaante)
  - Mohamed Mohamoud (Hinjiye)
  - Ahmed Mohamoud (Warsangeli)
    - Mohamed Ahmed (Warlabe)
    - Mohamoud Ahmed (War-ma’eke)
      - Kogo Mohamoud
        - Abdi Koge (Garweyne)
        - Abdullahi Koge (Garaad Dhidhin)
          - Hassan Abdullahi (Xamargale)
            - Abdirahman Hassan (Ogeyslabe)
            - Yusuf Hassan (Dubays)
            - Ibrahim Hassan
              - Osman Ibrahim
              - Omar Ibrahim (Cumar)
                - Mohamed Omar
                - Nuh Omar
                - Ahmed Omar
                - Yasif Omar
                - Mohamoud Omar
                  - Saed Mohamoud
                  - Ise Mohamoud
                    - Hussein Ise
                    - Saed Ise
                    - Yakub Ise
                      - Aden Yakub
                      - Saed Yakub
                        - Jibril Saed
                        - Yusuf Saed
                          - Hassan Yusuf
                          - Mohamed Yusuf
                          - Osman Yusuf
                          - Ise Yusuf
                            - Ali Ise
                              - Ismael Ali (Reer Xaaji)
                              - Liban Ali
                                - Ture Liban
                                - Yusuf Liban
                                  - Amir Yusuf
                                  - Osman Yusuf
                                  - Ahmed Yusuf
                                  - Abdi Yusuf
                                  - Salah Yusuf
                                  - Nuh Yusuf
                                  - Mohamoud Yusuf
                                    - Yusuf Mohamoud
                                    - Aamir Mohamoud
                                    - Abdalle Mohamoud (Garaad Caballe)
                                      - Ise Abdalle (Bah Ogeyslabe)
                                      - Ibrahim Abdalle (Bah Ogeyslabe)
                                      - Idris Abdalle (Bah Ogeyslabe)
                                      - Aden Abdalle (Bah Idoor)
                                      - Osman Abdalle (Bah Idoor)
                                      - Samatar Abdalle (Bah Idoor)
                                      - Ahmed Abdalle (Bah Majeerteen)
                                      - Ali Abdalle (Bah Majeerteen)

== Groups ==
- Shacni-cali was the smallest of the 13 Darawiish administrative divisions, and was exclusively composed of Warsangeli.
- Garbo Darawiish was a second-smallest segment of the 13 Darawiish administrative divisions, and was half Warsangeli, half Dhulbahante.
- Burcadde-godwein was the seventh largest of the dozen Darawiish administrative divisions, and was half Warsangeli, half Dhulbahante.
- Maakhir was a proto-state during the 2000s chiefly inhabited by Warsangeli.

== Notable members ==
- Abdilahi Qablan, first representative of Las Qorey for USP party
- Mohamud Caddaanweyne, first representative of Jidali for USP party
- Nuurxaashi Cali: commander of one of the two Garbo Darawiish subdivisions, named after himself
- Ismail Kharras: mentioned in the Geoffrey Archer's 1916 important members of Darawiish haroun list
- Gerad Abdulahi: first Garaad of the Warsangali in the late 13th century
- Gerad Hamar Gale: second sultan of the Warsangali
- Mohamoud Ali Shire (1897–1960): sultan of the Warsangeli; was exiled into Seychelles islands in 1920 for 7 years by the British Empire
- Abdillahi Mohammed Ahmed (1926–1993): known as Qablan, former Under-Secretary of Finance and former Minister of National Planning (1967–1969)
- Farah Mohamed Jama Awl (1937–1991): respected Somali author
- Omar Fateh: first Somali and Muslim State Senator in Minnesota
- Fatima Jibrell: founder of the Horn relief now known as ADESO
- Jibril Ali Salad (2006–2009): President of Maakhir State of Somalia
- Said Hassan Shire (2014–2015): former speaker of Puntland House of Representatives
- Mohamed Nuur Giriig (1935–2002): classical Somali singer, specializing in traditional Somali music
- Abdullahi Ahmed Jama: former Minister of Justice, former commander of the Somali National Army of Somalia and the President of Maakhir State of Somalia
- Ali Aden Lord: first Somali MP and later the Interior Minister of Kenya
- Ahmed Ismail Hussein: singer, songwriter, composer, instrumentalist; also known as King of Oud
- Gamal Mohamed Hassan (2016-): Minister of Planning, Investment and Economic Development of Federal Government of Somalia
- Faisal Hawar: Chairman of International Somalia Development Foundation, CEO of Maakhir Resource Company
- Ahmed Ali Mire: (2005 -): Development practitioner who has worked for international NGOs, UN organisations and development companies. https://solidaarisuus.fi/en/profile-ahmed-mire/ https://solidaarisuus.fi/solidaarisuuden-uusi-ohjelmakoordinaattori-on-kokenut-naisten-aseman-edistaja/

== See also ==
- Wargar, clan in Adal
