= KGHS =

KGHS may refer to:

- Kaohsiung Girl's High School, a prestigious, all-girls high school located in Cianjin District, Kaohsiung City, Taiwan.
- KGHS (AM)
