= List of sovereign states in 1620 =

== Sovereign states ==
=== A ===
- Aceh – Sultanate of Aceh
- Ahom – Ahom kingdom
- Ajuran – Ajuran Sultanate
- Alirajpur – Alirajpur State
- Alwar – Alwar State
- Angoche – Angoche Sultanate
- Anhalt-Bernburg – Principality of Anhalt-Bernburg
- Anhalt-Dessau – Principality of Anhalt-Dessau
- Anhalt-Köthen – Principality of Anhalt-Köthen
- Aragon – Kingdom of Aragon
- Athgarh – Athgarh State
- Austria – Archduchy of Austria
- Ayutthaya – Ayutthaya Kingdom

=== B ===
- Baguirmi – Sultanate of Bagirmi
- Bali – Bali Kingdom
- Banten – Banten Sultanate
- Baol – Kingdom of Baol
- Bavaria – Duchy of Bavaria
- Benin – Benin Empire
- Bohemia – Kingdom of Bohemia
- Bornu – Bornu Empire

=== C ===
- Cambodia
- Catalonia – Principality of Catalonia
- Cayor – Kingdom of Cayor
- Champa – Kingdom of Champa
- China – Ming dynasty
- Cochin – Kingdom of Cochin
- Cospaia – Republic of Cospaia
- Croatia (Habsburg) – Kingdom of Croatia (Habsburg)

=== D ===
- Dahomey – Kingdom of Dahomey
- Denanke – Denanke Kingdom
- Denmark–Norway
- Dendi – Dendi Kingdom

=== E ===
- England – Kingdom of England
- Ethiopia – Ethiopian Empire

=== F ===
- Frankfurt – Free City of Frankfurt
- France – Kingdom of France

=== G ===
- Galicia – Kingdom of Galicia
- Garo – Kingdom of Garo
- Garwhal – Garhwal Kingdom
- Genoa – Republic of Genoa
- Gyaaman

=== H ===
- Habsburg – Habsburg Monarchy
- Holstein – Duchy of Holstein
- Hohenzollern-Hechingen – Principality of Hohenzollern-Hechingen
- Hohenzollern-Sigmaringen – Principality of Hohenzollern-Sigmaringen
- Holstein – Duchy of Holstein
- Hungary – Kingdom of Hungary

=== I ===
- Imereti – Kingdom of Imereti
- Ireland – Kingdom of Ireland

=== J ===
- Jaisalmer – Jaisalmer State
- Janjero – Kingdom of Janjero
- Japan – Tokugawa shogunate
- Johor-Riau – Johor Sultanate
- Jolof – Kingdom of Jolof
- Joseon – Kingdom of Joseon

=== K ===
- Kaabu – Kaabu Empire
- Kaffa – Kingdom of Kaffa
- Kakheti – Kingdom of Kakheti
- Kalahandi – Kalahandi State
- Kandy – Kingdom of Kandy
- Kartli – Kingdom of Kartli
- Kasanje – Kasanje Kingdom (from 1620)
- Kasanze – Kasanze Kingdom
- Kazakh Khanate
- Kongo – Kingdom of Kongo
- Koya – Kingdom of Koya

=== L ===
- Lippe – Principality of Lippe
- Loango – Kingdom of Loango
- Luba – Kingdom of Luba
- Lübeck – Free City of Lübeck
- Lucca – Republic of Lucca

=== M ===
- Maguindanao – Sultanate of Maguindanao
- Maldives – Sultanate of the Maldives
- Mandara – Mandara Kingdom
- Manipur – Kingdom of Manipur
- Mankessim – Mankessim Kingdom
- Matamba – Kingdom of Matamba
- Mecklenburg-Schwerin – Duchy of Mecklenburg-Schwerin
- Medri Bahri
- Merina – Merina Kingdom
- Moldavia – Principality of Moldavia
- Modena – Duchy of Modena and Reggio
- Morocco – Saadi Sultanate
- Mughal Empire
- Mutapa – Kingdom of Mutapa
- Mysore – Kingdom of Mysore

=== N ===
- Naples – Kingdom of Naples
- Navarre – Kingdom of Navarre
- New Granada – Kingdom of the New Granada
- Nri – Kingdom of Nri

=== O ===
- Ottoman Empire - Sublime Ottoman State
- Oualo – Kingdom of Oualo

=== P ===
- Papal States - State of the Church
- Parma – Duchy of Parma
- Pattani – Pattani Kingdom
- Portugal – Kingdom of Portugal
- Prussia – Kingdom of Prussia

=== R ===
- Ragusa – Republic of Ragusa
- Reuss-Lobenstein – Principality of Reuss-Lobenstein
- Ryukyu – Ryukyu Kingdom

=== S ===
- Safavid – Safavid dynasty
- Saloum – Kingdom of Saloum
- Sardinia – Kingdom of Sardinia
- Saxe-Lauenburg – Duchy of Saxe-Lauenburg
- Scotland – Kingdom of Scotland
- Schleswig – Duchy of Schleswig
- Sennar – Sultanate of Sennar
- Sicily – Kingdom of Sicily
- Sine – Kingdom of Sine
- Sirmoor – Sirmur State
- Soran – Soran Emirate
- Sulu – Sultanate of Sulu
- Chutiya – Chutiya Kingdom
- Sweden

=== T ===
- Toledo – Kingdom of Toledo
- Tuscany – Grand Duchy of Tuscany
- Tripura – Twipra Kingdom

=== V ===
- Valencia – Kingdom of Valencia

=== W ===
- Waldeck – Principality of Waldeck and Pyrmont
- Wallachia – Principality of Wallachia
- Warsangli – Warsangali Sultanate
- Württemberg – Kingdom of Württemberg

== Non-sovereign territories ==
=== England ===
- English America
