= Dhidhin =

Gerad Abdulahi Kooge Mohamud Harti جراد عبد الله كوجى محمود هرتى
- 1st Sultan of the Warsangali Sultanate
- Reign: 1298–1311
- Successor: Gerad Hamar Gale (1311–1328)
- Dynasty: Warsangali Dynasty
- Religion: Islam

Garaad Dhidhin (Somali: Abdulaahi Kooge Maxamuud Harti, Arabic: عبد الله كوجى محمود هرتى (Abdullah bin Kouj bin Mahmoud bin Hartiyy)) also known as Garaad Abdulahi, was the founder of the Warsangali Sultanate in the late 13th century in the territory of present-day North Somalia.
