= Hamar Gale =

Hassan Gerad Abdullahi Dhidhin حسن جراد عبد الله
- 2nd Sultan of the Warsangali Sultanate
- Reign: 1311–1328
- Predecessor: Gerad Dhidhin (1298–1311)
- Successor: Gerad Ibrahim (1328–1340)
- Dynasty: Warsangali Dynasty
- Religion: Islam

Gerad Hamar Gale or Xamar Gale, known in full as Gerad Hassan Gerad Abdullahi Dhidhin (Arabic: حسن جراد عبد الله) (b.1311–1328), was a Somali ruler. He was the second Sultan of the Warsangali Sultanate.

== Overview ==
Garad Hamar Gale was born into a royal Warsangali Darod family, as the son of Gerad Dhidhin, the founder of the Warsangali Sultanate. He succeeded his father as Sultan in 1311.

Hamar Gale's popular nickname "Hamar Gale" or "Xamar Gale" first came about after he departed his clan's traditional strongholds in northern modern-day Somalia for the ancient southeastern city of Mogadishu (popular known as "Xamar") and its environs—an area to which his sobriquet is a direct reference. His nickname thus literally translates as "Mogadishu settler."

After Hamar Gale eventually left Mogadishu, he is believed to have then established a permanent settlement elsewhere. His modern descendants that still reside in the region between the southern middle Shebelle River and the Benadir zone have preserved the Warsangali clan name denoting their ancestral origin. However, they have since completely integrated into the local Abgaal, the main Hawiye sub-clan in Mogadishu.

Hamar Gale continued to assume leadership of the Warsangali Sultanate until 1328 when he was succeeded atop the throne by Gerad Ibrahim.

=== Gerad Hassan's Sons ===
- ibraahin Gerad Hassan (Cumar)
- Abdirahman Gerad Hassan (Ogeyslabe)
- Yusuf Gerad Hassan (Dubays)

== See also ==
- Somali aristocratic and court titles
