= International Falls, Minnesota =

City in Minnesota, United States

International Falls
- City
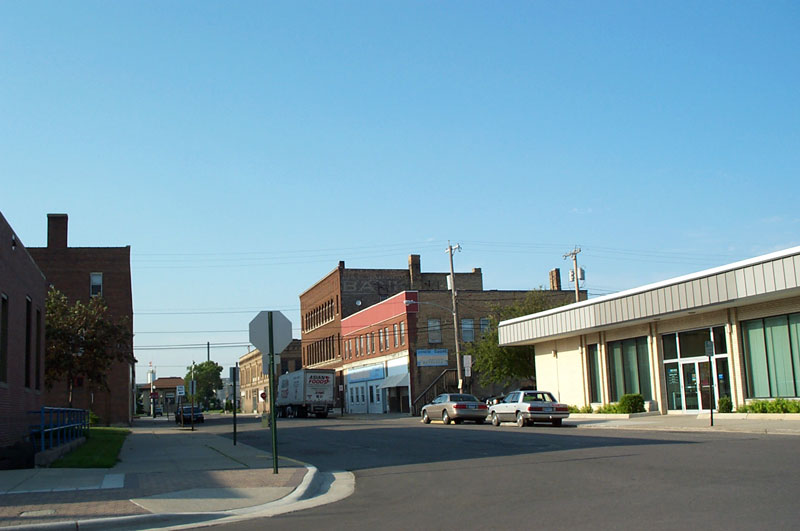
- International Falls
- Nicknames: Icebox of the Nation, Frostbite Falls
- Location of International Falls within Koochiching County and the U.S. state of Minnesota

- Location within the United States
- Coordinates: 48°35′30″N 93°24′19″W
- Country: United States
- State: Minnesota
- County: Koochiching
- Founded: 1870

Government
  - Mayor: Drake Dill

Area
  - Total: 6.42 sq mi (16.63 km^{2})
  - Land: 6.41 sq mi (16.60 km^{2})
  - Water: 0.012 sq mi (0.03 km^{2})
- Elevation: 1,132 ft (345 m)

Population (2020)
  - Total: 5,802
  - Estimate (2023): 5,603
  - Density: 905.3/sq mi (349.55/km^{2})
- Time zone: UTC-6 (Central)
  - Summer (DST): UTC-5 (-CDT)
- ZIP code: 56649, 56679
- Area code: 218
- FIPS code: 27-31040
- GNIS feature ID: 0645435
- Website: ci.international-falls.mn.us

International Falls, on the south bank of Rainy River, which serves as the U.S.–Canada border

International Falls (sometimes referred to as I-Falls) is a city in and the county seat of Koochiching County, Minnesota, United States. The population was 5,802 at the time of the 2020 census.

International Falls is located on the Rainy River directly across from Fort Frances, Ontario, Canada. The two cities are connected by the Fort Frances–International Falls International Bridge. Voyageurs National Park is located 11 miles east of International Falls. There is a major U.S. Customs and Border Protection Port of Entry on the International Falls side of the toll bridge and a Canadian Customs entry point on the north side of the bridge.

International Falls is nicknamed the "Icebox of the Nation", with an average of 109.4 days per year with a high temperature below 32 °F (0 °C).

== History ==
The area now known as International Falls was inhabited by many indigenous peoples. The International Falls area was well known to explorers, missionaries, and voyagers as early as the 17th century. It was not until April 1895 that the community was platted by L. A. Ogaard, a teacher and preacher for the Koochiching Company, and named Koochiching. The word "Koochiching" comes from either the Ojibwe word Gojijiing or the Cree Kocicīhk, both meaning "at the place of inlets", referring to the neighbouring Rainy Lake and River. The European inhabitants gave the names Rainy Lake and Rainy River to the nearby bodies of water because of the mist-like rain present at the falls where the lake flowed into the river.

On August 10, 1901, the village was incorporated. Two years later, its name was changed to International Falls in recognition of the river's role as a border between the United States and Canada. It was incorporated as a city in 1909.

Realizing the potential for water power and mills in the area, industrialist E.W. Backus, president of the Minnesota and Ontario Paper Company in the early 20th century, built a dam on the Rainy River to power the company's mills. Purchased by Boise Cascade Corporation in 1965, and sold to an investment group in 2003, the company remains the largest business and employer in the area. In 2013 Boise laid off 394 employees and closed down a paper machine. It then sold to Packaging Corporation of America (PCA).

== Geography ==
According to the United States Census Bureau, the city has a total area of 6.53 square miles (16.9 km^{2}), of which 6.42 square miles (16.6 km^{2}) is land and 0.11 square miles (0.28 km^{2}) is water.

=== Climate ===
Climate chart for International Falls

International Falls, with its relatively central position in the North American continent, has a warm-summer humid continental climate (Köppen: Dfb), with long, bitterly cold winters and humid, warm summers and is part of USDA Plant hardiness zone 3a. January averages 5.0 °F (−15.0 °C), and lows reach 0 °F (−18 °C) on an average of 57.2 nights annually. Highs only reach the freezing point or above an average of 16.7 days in the months of December, January, and February, and the temperature often stays below freezing for weeks at a time during the winter. In the winter of 1978 to 1979, the temperature stayed below freezing for 101 days, from November 17 to February 25. Seasonal snowfall averages 73.0 in (185 cm); due to the cold typically preventing significant melting for much of the winter, snow depths of 5 in (13 cm) or more are seen on a majority of days from December through March. Spring, and more especially autumn, are short but mild transition seasons. July averages 64.9 °F (18.3 °C), with highs reaching 90 °F (32 °C) an average of only 2 days annually, and in close to 40% of years, the temperature does not rise that high. Precipitation averages about 25.37 in (644 mm) per year, and is concentrated in the warmer months. The average window for freezing temperatures is September 14 through May 26, allowing a frost-free period of 110 days; however, the all-time record for the latest first freeze was set relatively recently on October 17, 2021, being over a month late. Measurable snowfall (≥0.1 in or 0.25 cm) arrives on average on October 18 and departs April 22. The all-time record high temperature is 103 °F (39 °C), set on July 22, 1923, while the all-time record low is −55 °F (−48 °C), set on January 6, 1909, a range of 158 °F (88 °C); the record cold maximum is −29 °F (−34 °C), set on the same day as the record low, while, conversely, the record warm minimum is 79 °F (26 °C) on July 16, 1898.

Climate data for International Falls, Minnesota (Falls International Airport), 1991–2020 normals, (Note: Mean monthly maxima and minima (i.e. the expected highest and lowest temperature readings at any point during the year or given month) calculated based on data at said location from 1991 to 2020.) extremes 1897–present
Month	Jan	Feb	Mar	Apr	May	Jun	Jul	Aug	Sep	Oct	Nov	Dec	Year
Record high °F (°C)	53 (12)	58 (14)	79 (26)	93 (34)	95 (35)	101 (38)	103 (39)	96 (36)	96 (36)	88 (31)	74 (23)	56 (13)	103 (39)
Mean maximum °F (°C)	38.5 (3.6)	42.9 (6.1)	56.1 (13.4)	72.5 (22.5)	83.7 (28.7)	86.7 (30.4)	88.7 (31.5)	87.4 (30.8)	83.6 (28.7)	74.0 (23.3)	54.7 (12.6)	39.7 (4.3)	90.7 (32.6)
Mean daily maximum °F (°C)	15.7 (−9.1)	21.7 (−5.7)	35.4 (1.9)	50.1 (10.1)	64.2 (17.9)	73.5 (23.1)	77.7 (25.4)	76.0 (24.4)	66.4 (19.1)	51.2 (10.7)	34.4 (1.3)	20.8 (−6.2)	48.9 (9.4)
Daily mean °F (°C)	5.0 (−15.0)	9.5 (−12.5)	23.6 (−4.7)	38.1 (3.4)	51.1 (10.6)	60.8 (16.0)	64.9 (18.3)	62.8 (17.1)	54.2 (12.3)	41.1 (5.1)	26.3 (−3.2)	11.8 (−11.2)	37.4 (3.0)
Mean daily minimum °F (°C)	−5.8 (−21.0)	−2.6 (−19.2)	11.8 (−11.2)	26.1 (−3.3)	38.1 (3.4)	48.2 (9.0)	52.0 (11.1)	49.7 (9.8)	42.0 (5.6)	31.1 (−0.5)	18.1 (−7.7)	2.7 (−16.3)	26.0 (−3.3)
Mean minimum °F (°C)	−33.0 (−36.1)	−28.7 (−33.7)	−16.4 (−26.9)	10.7 (−11.8)	24.4 (−4.2)	33.4 (0.8)	40.1 (4.5)	37.0 (2.8)	26.8 (−2.9)	16.9 (−8.4)	−3.2 (−19.6)	−25.2 (−31.8)	−36.2 (−37.9)
Record low °F (°C)	−55 (−48)	−48 (−44)	−38 (−39)	−14 (−26)	8 (−13)	23 (−5)	32 (0)	27 (−3)	19 (−7)	2 (−17)	−32 (−36)	−41 (−41)	−55 (−48)
Average precipitation inches (mm)	0.79 (20)	0.69 (18)	1.02 (26)	1.64 (42)	3.06 (78)	3.78 (96)	3.97 (101)	2.82 (72)	3.00 (76)	2.22 (56)	1.39 (35)	0.99 (25)	25.37 (644)
Average snowfall inches (cm)	15.7 (40)	12.6 (32)	7.9 (20)	7.0 (18)	0.2 (0.51)	0.0 (0.0)	0.0 (0.0)	0.0 (0.0)	0.1 (0.25)	1.6 (4.1)	12.1 (31)	15.8 (40)	73.0 (185)
Average extreme snow depth inches (cm)	17.2 (44)	18.7 (47)	16.0 (41)	6.7 (17)	0.1 (0.25)	0.0 (0.0)	0.0 (0.0)	0.0 (0.0)	0.0 (0.0)	0.9 (2.3)	6.3 (16)	10.7 (27)	21.4 (54)
Average precipitation days (≥ 0.01 in)	10.1	9.0	8.3	9.4	12.7	13.8	12.5	11.0	12.2	12.6	10.2	11.1	132.9
Average snowy days (≥ 0.1 in)	13.6	11.4	6.9	4.0	0.4	0.0	0.0	0.0	0.1	2.5	10.0	12.5	61.4
Average relative humidity (%)	70.8	67.4	65.7	61.1	61.3	68.6	71.2	74.8	77.1	74.2	78.8	77.1	70.7
Average dew point °F (°C)	−5.4 (−20.8)	−0.2 (−17.9)	12.6 (−10.8)	25.2 (−3.8)	37.6 (3.1)	49.6 (9.8)	56.1 (13.4)	54.3 (12.4)	45.3 (7.4)	33.8 (1.0)	19.2 (−7.1)	2.5 (−16.4)	27.6 (−2.5)
Source: NOAA (relative humidity 1961–1990)

See or edit raw graph data.

=== Icebox of the Nation ===
International Falls has long promoted itself as the "Icebox of the Nation"; however, the trademark for the slogan has been challenged on several occasions by the small town of Fraser, Colorado. Officials from Fraser claimed usage since 1956, International Falls since 1948. The two towns came to an agreement in 1986, when International Falls paid Fraser $2,000 to relinquish its "official" claim. However, in 1996, International Falls inadvertently failed to renew its federal trademark, although it had kept its state trademark up to date. Fraser then filed to gain the federal trademark. International Falls submitted photographic proof that its 1955 Pee Wee hockey team traveled to Boston, Massachusetts with the slogan. After several years of legal battles, the United States Patent and Trademark Office officially registered the slogan with International Falls on January 29, 2008, Registration Number 3375139. Only a few days after announcing its success in the trademark battle, International Falls had a daily record low temperature of −40 °F (−40 °C), beating a previous record of −37 °F (−38 °C) in 1967.

== Demographics ==
Historical population
Census	Pop.	Note	%±
1910	1,487		—
1920	3,448		131.9%
1930	5,036		46.1%
1940	5,626		11.7%
1950	6,269		11.4%
1960	6,778		8.1%
1970	6,439		−5.0%
1980	5,611		−12.9%
1990	8,324		48.4%
2000	6,703		−19.5%
2010	6,424		−4.2%
2020	5,802		−9.7%
2022 (est.)	5,665		−2.4%
U.S. Decennial Census; 2020 Census

=== 2020 census ===
As of the 2020 census, International Falls had a population of 5,802. The median age was 44.6 years. 20.4% of residents were under the age of 18 and 22.9% of residents were 65 years of age or older. For every 100 females there were 94.3 males, and for every 100 females age 18 and over there were 93.2 males age 18 and over.

96.9% of residents lived in urban areas, while 3.1% lived in rural areas.

There were 2,793 households in International Falls, of which 22.7% had children under the age of 18 living in them. Of all households, 33.3% were married-couple households, 24.1% were households with a male householder and no spouse or partner present, and 33.2% were households with a female householder and no spouse or partner present. About 42.2% of all households were made up of individuals and 19.1% had someone living alone who was 65 years of age or older.

There were 3,144 housing units, of which 11.2% were vacant. The homeowner vacancy rate was 2.0% and the rental vacancy rate was 10.9%.

Racial composition as of the 2020 census
Race	Number	Percent
White	5,198	89.6%
Black or African American	38	0.7%
American Indian and Alaska Native	153	2.6%
Asian	14	0.2%
Native Hawaiian and Other Pacific Islander	3	0.1%
Some other race	32	0.6%
Two or more races	364	6.3%
Hispanic or Latino (of any race)	93	1.6%

=== Income and poverty ===
As of 2000, the median income for a household in the city was $29,908, and the median income for a family was $41,458. Males had a median income of $41,584 versus $20,053 for females. The per capita income for the city was $19,171. About 10.0% of families and 14.5% of the population were below the poverty line, including 20.5% of those under age 18 and 12.3% of those age 65 or over.

=== 2010 census ===
As of the census of 2010, there were 6,424 people, 2,903 households, and 1,645 families residing in the city. The population density was 1,001 inhabitants per square mile (386/km^{2}). There were 3,157 housing units at an average density of 492 per square mile (190/km^{2}). The racial makeup of the city was 93.3% White, 1.0% African American, 2.5% Native American, 0.2% Asian, 0.1% from other races, and 2.8% from two or more races. Hispanic or Latino of any race were 1.1% of the population.

There were 2,903 households, of which 26.6% had children under the age of 18 living with them, 39.1% were married couples living together, 12.1% had a female householder with no husband present, 5.5% had a male householder with no wife present, and 43.3% were non-families. 37.4% of all households were made up of individuals, and 16.4% had someone living alone who was 65 years of age or older. The average household size was 2.16 and the average family size was 2.80.

The median age in the city was 42.4 years. 21.9% of residents were under the age of 18; 8.6% were between the ages of 18 and 24; 22.4% were from 25 to 44; 27.3% were from 45 to 64; and 19.8% were 65 years of age or older. The gender makeup of the city was 48.1% male and 51.9% female.

=== 2000 census ===
As of the census of 2000, there were 6,703 people, 2,959 households, and 1,751 families residing in the city. The racial makeup of the city was 95.3% White, 0.3% African American, 2.6% Native American, 0.2% Asian, 0.2% from other races, and 1.5% from two or more races. Hispanic or Latino of any race were 0.7% of the population.

There were 2,959 households, of which 27.6% had children under the age of 18 living with them, 44% were married couples living together, 11.4% had a female householder with no husband present and 40.8% were non-families. 36.5% of all households were made up of individuals, and 18.2% had someone living alone who was 65 years of age or older. The average household size was 2.20 and the average family size was 2.85.

The median age in the city was 40.5 years. 23.3% of residents were under the age of 18; 5.1% were between the ages of 20 and 24; 25.5% were from 25 to 44; 22.3% were from 45 to 64; and 20.7% were 65 years of age or older. The gender makeup of the city was 47.7% male and 52.3% female.

== Politics ==
Presidential election results

2020 Precinct Results Spreadsheet2016 Precinct Results Spreadsheet2012 Precinct Results Spreadsheet2008 Precinct Results Spreadsheet2004 Precinct Results Spreadsheet2000 Precinct Results Spreadsheet
Year	Republican	Democratic	Third parties
2020	54.2% 1,660	43.9% 1,343	1.9% 59
2016	52.0% 1,451	39.6% 1,106	8.4% 234
2012	38.2% 1,106	58.9% 1,703	2.9% 83
2008	39.2% 1,190	58.4% 1,771	2.4% 73
2004	43.0% 1,442	55.7% 1,866	1.3% 44
2000	44.1% 1,383	47.3% 1,481	8.6% 270

== Local media ==
=== FM ===
FM radio stations
Frequency	Call sign	Name	Format	Owner
88.3; 88.3 HD-2	KITF	MPR News; Classical MPR	NPR; Classical	Minnesota Public Radio
91.9	KXBR	The Bridge	Christian	Heartland Christian Broadcasters, Inc.
95.3	W237EX (KGHS-AM Translator)		Oldies	R & J Broadcasting
97.7	K249BK (KITF HD-2 Translator)	Classical MPR	Classical	Minnesota Public Radio
99.5	KBHW	Psalm 99:5	Christian	Heartland Christian Broadcasters, Inc.
104.1	KSDM	K-104	Country	R & J Broadcasting

The local Icebox Radio Theater produces radio drama broadcasts on 106.9 FM, with a power output of one watt.

=== AM ===
AM radio stations
Frequency	Call sign	Name	Format	Owner
1230	KGHS		Oldies	R & J Broadcasting

=== Television ===
Channel	Callsign	Affiliation	Branding	Subchannels		Owner
(Virtual)	Callsign	Affiliation	Branding	Channel	Programming	Owner
9.1	K18MB-D (KAWE Translator)	PBS	Lakeland PBS	9.2; 9.3; 9.4; 9.5; 9.6	First Nations Experience; PBS Kids; Create; PBS Encore; Minnesota Channel	County of Koochiching
11.1	K22MZ-D (KRII Translator)	NBC	KBJR 6	11.2; 11.3	CBS; H&I/MyNetworkTV	County of Koochiching
13.1	K24MT-D (WIRT Translator)	ABC		13.2; 13.3	MeTV; Ion Television	County of Koochiching
21.1	K20NR-D (KQDS Translator)	Fox	FOX 21	21.2	Antenna TV	Red River Broadcasting
39.1	K38MM-D	3ABN		39.2; 39.3; 39.4; 39.5; 39.6; 39.7	3ABN Proclaim; 3ABN Dare to Dream; 3ABN Latino; 3ABN Radio; 3ABN Radio Latino; Radio 74	Edge Spectrum, Inc.

Local cable television service is offered by Midcontinent Communications.

=== Newspaper ===
==== The Journal ====
Since 1911, the local newspaper was The Journal. The newspaper announced its closure on June 3, 2021, with June 24, 2021 being its last edition.

==== Rainy Lake Gazette ====
On Friday, July 16, 2021, CherryRoad Media Inc. distributed Volume 1, Issue 1 of its newest publication, the Rainy Lake Gazette.

== Culture ==
- Icebox Radio Theater

The Backus Community Center opened in 2002 and serves as one of the cultural centers of International Falls. Each year, the Backus Performing Arts Series presents a number of musical and stage productions to the local community.

The Borealis Bards community theatre group has staged a number of productions since its founding in 2014, including 2015's production of Alice In Wonderland.

The International Falls post office contains a mural, Early Lodging in Koochiching Falls, painted by Lucia Wiley. Federally commissioned murals were produced from 1934 to 1943 in the United States through the Section of Painting and Sculpture, later called the Section of Fine Arts, of the Treasury Department. The WPA was the largest and most ambitious American New Deal agency, employing individuals to carry out public works projects.

== Transportation ==
Falls International Airport (IATA code: INL, ICAO code: KINL) is a public airport located just south of the city. The airport has two runways. It is mostly used for general aviation but is also served by Delta Air Lines which has two daily flights to Minneapolis–Saint Paul International Airport using the Bombardier CRJ-700 jet airliner.

The Minnesota, Dakota and Western Railway operates a 4 mi (6.4 km) line between International Falls and Ranier.

=== Major highways ===
The following routes are located within the city of International Falls.

- U.S. Highway 53
- U.S. Highway 71
- Minnesota State Highway 11

Port Code: 3604

== References in popular culture ==
A Sears Diehard car battery commercial was filmed in International Falls in the 1970s, playing on the city's extremely cold winter climate to promote the longevity and effectiveness of the product. It led to a parody ad – aired several times in the first (1975) season of Saturday Night Live – promoting a geriatric product.

The fictional Minnesota small town of Frostbite Falls, which was the hometown of cartoon characters Rocket "Rocky" J. Squirrel and Bullwinkle J. Moose of The Rocky and Bullwinkle Show, was a spoof of the real-life International Falls. The fictional town was located in Koochiching County as well.

The 2019 dark comedy film International Falls, starring Rachael Harris, Rob Heubel, and Matthew Glave, is set and filmed in International Falls.

== Notable people ==
- Edward Backus, industrialist
- Tammy Bakker, PTL, The 700 Club
- Dean Blais, hockey coach, University of Nebraska, Omaha, NCHC
- Bill Borcher, University of Oregon head basketball coach 1951–1956
- Keith Christiansen, hockey player, United States Hockey Hall of Fame, silver medalist and co-captain of 1972 USA Team in Winter Olympics Sapporo, Japan
- Kevin Constantine, hockey coach, NHL, IHL
- Jim Crotty, pro football player, Washington Redskins
- Mike Curran, hockey player, United States Hockey Hall of Fame, 1972 Winter Olympics silver medal
- Richard Dougherty, Minnesota Gopher Hall of Fame hockey, silver medal 1956 Olympic Games
- Constance Edith Fowler, artist, printmaker, author, educator
- Arlys Johnson-Maxwell, weightlifter Senior World Champion 1987
- Bob Mason, Goalie NHL 1984–1991, goaltending coach of Minnesota Wild
- Bronko Nagurski, football player, member of the College Football Hall of Fame and the Pro Football Hall of Fame
- Bronko Nagurski Jr., football player for Notre Dame and in Canadian Football League
- Bob Neuenschwander, Minnesota state legislator and businessman
- Ernest Oberholtzer, explorer, author, conservationist
- Gary Sampson, hockey player, Washington Capitals
- Neil Sheehy, hockey player, Calgary Flames, Hartford Whalers, and Washington Capitals NHL Hockey Agent
- Timothy Sheehy, hockey player, United States Hockey Hall of Fame, silver medalist and co-captain of 1972 USA Team in Winter Olympics Sapporo, Japan
- Frank Youso, NFL player, New York Giants, Oakland Raiders, Minnesota Vikings
- Larry Ross, International Falls High School hockey coach 1954–1985, won 6 Minnesota High school state championships

== See also ==
- Voyageurs National Park
