= Ali Aden Lord =

Kenyan politician (1915–1961)

Ali Adan Lord
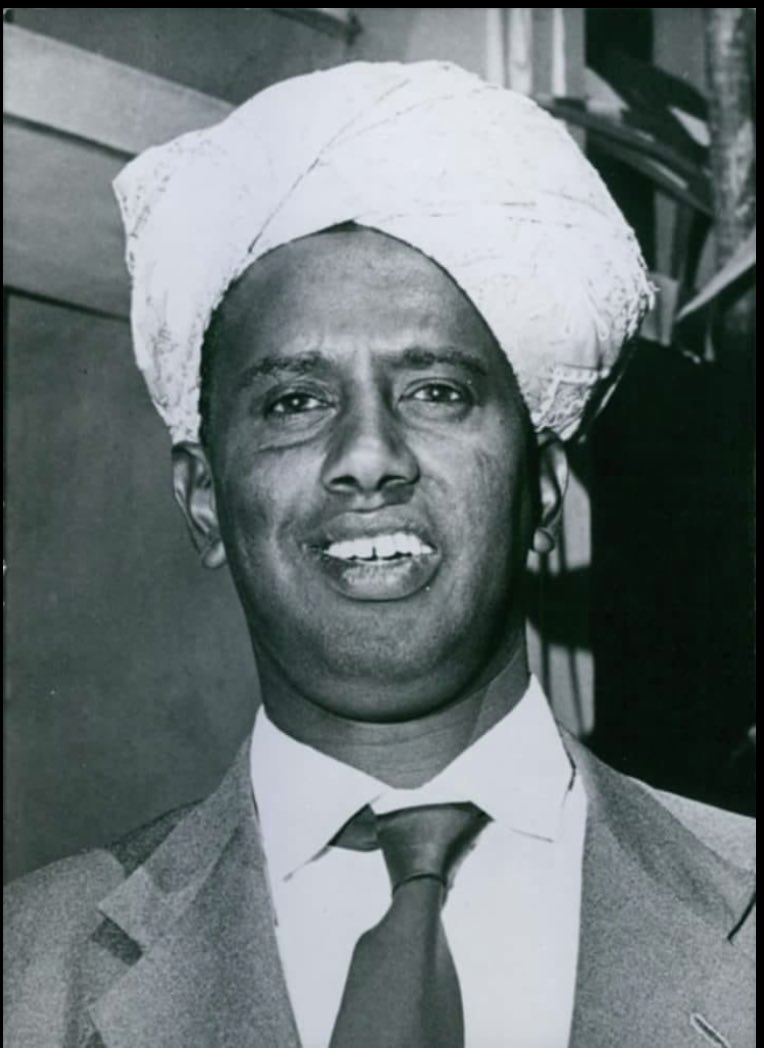

Interior Minister of Kenya

Personal details
- Born: 1915 Nairobi
- Died: May 9, 1961 (aged 45–46) Nairobi
- Party: Kenya African National Union (KANU)

Ali Adan Lord (1915-1961) became the first Somali MP and later the Interior Minister of Kenya. As Interior Minister, Lord included, along with Jomo Kenyatta, the state delegation that went to Mogadishu during President Sharmaake’s term.

== Early life ==
Ali Aden Lord was born in 1915 circa in Nairobi, Kenya. He is a member of the Adan Lord family from Laasqoray, Sanaag region of Somalia. As his last name suggests, he came to own and was bequeathed to him a huge swath of land in the Eastleigh section of Nairobi, including the Air Force base area, as a result of his father’s legacy. Ali Aden Lord also owned many other real estate properties in Kenya.

== Career ==
Ali Aden Lord joined the Mau Mau resistance later and became a key figure in its leadership. He was said to have been a close friend of Jomo Kenyata during the struggle for political independence.

Lord was the founder of the North Eastern People Progressive Party (NPPP). During his political career he campaigned vigorously to improve the conditions of Somalis in the four frontier districts from its utter neglect and isolation. He was liked and particularly popular in his letters and petitions to different governors in pre-independent Kenya. He raised the bar for economic development and strove to secure a coherent policy of integration. Of special note is the introduction of educational facilities in the Somali region and of many scholarships.

In mid-1961, Lord and British Secretary for Colonial Affairs met in Nairobi and discussed over NPPP's independent platform. He was allowed to attend the Constitutional Conference at Lancaster House in London.

At the conference, Lord articulated Somalis' fear and concern over their political rights as a religiously distinct and minority ethnic group. He pleaded his case that if Britain did not give the NFD the right to self-determination before it handed over political power to Kenya, “the frontier could expect neglect, bad administration and disregard for their rights at best and at worst oppression”. For this, he became the sole candidate for the entire NFD and won his seat in the Parliament as a KADU-Independent member. Lord became a member of the LEGCO in 1960, a legislative council whose membership had been previously exclusive to white settlers until the late 1950s.

He was aware of the futility of the secessionist platform of NPPP. Nevertheless, the concept of Greater Somalia dominated public opinion and he used it as a crucial rallying point for his mandate over what his critics referred to as a “weak grassroots base” because having born, educated and lived outside the region for most of his life, he did not want to be seen as an outsider and collaborator of the colonial designs of Kenya. He used the secessionist platform to address the underlying ethnic grievances.

Consequently he filed a number of petitions to the governor Sir Patrick Renison that Somalis be given a greater autonomy in their political, cultural and social affairs. However, it was concluded at the Lancaster House that Somalis from the non-self governing Somali territory of NFD shared a common political destiny with the rest of Kenya despite the findings of an independent Commission appointed by the British Government that Somalis were in favor of an independence and immediate union with Somalia. Though a federal solution was proposed in the Kenyan constitution as an amendment on the eve of Independence, the government suspended the clause and opted for a centralized format in 1964. Jomo Kenyatta vehemently defended his country’s territorial integrity even if took using lethal force.

He later adopted a long-term policy that the political issues between the secessionist-inspired NPPP and the two major political parties of KADU and KANU be resolved through consensus and mutual respect. Interior Minister Lord was a catalyst for the degree of contemporary political participation of Somalis in Kenya.
