= KXBR =

Radio station in International Falls, Minnesota

- International Falls, Minnesota; United States
- Broadcast area: International Falls, Minnesota
- Frequency: 91.9 MHz
- Branding: 91.9 Bridge FM

Programming
- Format: Christian radio

Ownership
- Owner: Heartland Christian Broadcasters, Inc.
- Sister stations: KADU, KBHW

History
- Former call signs: KBOG (1999–2000, CP)

Technical information
- Licensing authority: FCC
- Facility ID: 91083
- Class: A
- ERP: 1,500 watts
- HAAT: 39 meters (128 ft)
- Transmitter coordinates: 48°34′15.00″N 93°26′19.00″W
- Repeater: 90.3 K212FM (Warroad)

Links
- Public license information: Public file; LMS

KXBR (91.9 FM) is a radio station licensed to International Falls, Minnesota, United States. The station is owned by Heartland Christian Broadcasters.

== History ==
The station was assigned call sign KBOG on July 9, 1999. On January 19, 2000, the station changed its call sign to the current KXBR. It initially programmed a modern Christian rock format for the International Falls and Fort Frances area. featuring bands like Skillet, P.O.D., 12 Stones, Sent By Ravens, Red, and others.

The day after Thanksgiving 2013, KXBR changed formats to Christmas music. Following the Christmas format, KXBR became a Christian teaching/talk station on January 1, 2014.
