= KBHW =

Christian radio station in International Falls, Minnesota

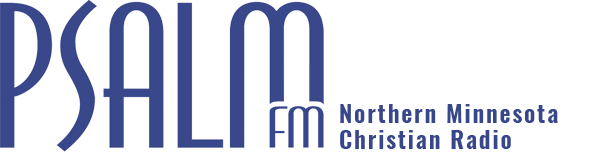
- International Falls, Minnesota; United States
- Broadcast area: International Falls-Fort Frances
- Frequency: 99.5 MHz
- Branding: 99.5 Psalm FM

Programming
- Format: Christian radio
- Affiliations: Moody Radio; Salem Radio Network, Associated Press

Ownership
- Owner: Heartland Christian Broadcasters, Inc.
- Sister stations: KADU, KXBR

History
- First air date: 1982

Technical information
- Licensing authority: FCC
- Facility ID: 42902
- Class: C1
- ERP: 100,000 watts
- HAAT: 171 meters (561 ft)
- Transmitter coordinates: 48°33′44.64″N 93°49′21.72″W

Links
- Public license information: Public file; LMS
- Webcast: Listen Live
- Website: psalmfm.org

KBHW (99.5 FM, "Psalm FM") is a radio station broadcasting a Christian radio format. Licensed to International Falls, Minnesota, United States, the station is currently owned by Heartland Christian Broadcasters, Inc.

== History ==
The Federal Communications Commission issued a construction permit for the station to Minnesota Christian Broadcasters Inc. on June 30, 1982. The station was issued the KBHW call sign on August 16, 1982, and received its license to cover on November 30, 1983. On July 23, 1999, Minnesota Christian assigned the license to the current owners, Heartland Christian Broadcasters, Inc.

== Translators ==
In addition to the main station, KBHW is relayed by an additional 11 translators to widen its broadcast area.

Call sign	Frequency	City of license	FID	ERP (W)	Class	FCC info
K241BJ	96.1 FM	Angle Inlet, Minnesota	140199	250	D	LMS
K237BE	95.3 FM	Babbitt, Minnesota	26637	53	D	LMS
W224AB	92.7 FM	Bemidji, Minnesota	49921	78	D	LMS
K280AZ	103.9 FM	Cook, Minnesota	63352	91	D	LMS
K237CE	95.3 FM	Ely, Minnesota	26634	9	D	LMS
K280AW	104.1 FM	Hoyt Lakes, Minnesota		110	D	
W265BT	100.9 FM	Tower, Minnesota	140198	38	D	LMS
W237AO	95.3 FM	Virginia, Minnesota	26635	16	D	LMS
K204EL	88.7 FM	Warroad, Minnesota	6435	249	D	LMS
K236AD	95.1 FM	Grand Rapids, Minnesota	76210	17	D	LMS
