= KSDM =

- International Falls, Minnesota; United States
- Broadcast area: International Falls
- Frequency: FM 104.1 MHz
- Branding: K-104 Country

Programming
- Format: Country
- Affiliations: Westwood One

Ownership
- Owner: Jimmy D. Birkemeyer; (R & J Broadcasting, Inc.)
- Sister stations: KGHS

History
- First air date: March 17, 1979

Technical information
- Licensing authority: FCC
- Facility ID: 12715
- Class: C3
- ERP: 8,500 watts
- HAAT: 52.0 meters (171 feet)
- Transmitter coordinates: 48°35′29.00″N 93°22′54.00″W

Links
- Public license information: Public file; LMS

KSDM (104.1 FM; "K-104 Country") is a radio station licensed to serve International Falls, Minnesota, United States. KSDM broadcasts a country music format, from the Westwood One network. The studios are at 519 Third Street, shared with sister station KGHS. Both also share a one tower transmitter site east of town. The station is owned by Jimmy D. Birkemeyer's R & J Broadcasting, along with KGHS.

On September 16, 2016, Red Rock Radio announced that it would sell KSDM and KGHS to R & J Broadcasting as part of an eight station deal; the sale was completed on December 21, 2016.

== On-Air Personalities ==
There are two main radio personalities who dominate the airwaves in International Falls. Preston Otterson and Duane Etienne run a Morning Show and then Lunch with the Legends at noon. Preston Otterson is the Sports Director, covering local and regional sports. Duane Eitienne is the News Director covering the news in the area as well as regionally. You can find their show on rjbroadcasting.com.
