= KGHS (AM) =

- International Falls, Minnesota; United States
- Broadcast area: International Falls-Fort Frances
- Frequency: 1230 kHz
- Branding: Oldies 95.3 KGHS

Programming
- Format: Oldies
- Affiliations: Associated Press; Westwood One (Good Time Oldies)

Ownership
- Owner: Jimmy D. Birkemeyer; (R & J Broadcasting, Inc.)
- Sister stations: KSDM

History
- First air date: September 1, 1959

Technical information
- Licensing authority: FCC
- Facility ID: 12723
- Class: C
- Power: 460 watts day 230 watts night
- Transmitter coordinates: 48°35′29″N 93°22′54″W
- Translator: 95.3 W237EX (International Falls)

Links
- Public license information: Public file; LMS
- Webcast: Listen Live
- Website: rjbroadcasting.com

KGHS (1230 AM) is a local radio station in International Falls, Minnesota, broadcasting at 1230 with 460 watts day and 230 watts night. KGHS carries Westwood One's "Good Time Oldies" format, via satellite. It also carries local news and information programming. The station is owned by Jimmy D. Birkemeyer, through licensee R & J Broadcasting. Its one transmitting tower is east of the town. The studios are at 519 Third Street, with sister station KSDM.

KGHS first went on the air in 1959. The music format at that time was a mixture of just about any and everything from country, instrumentals, big bands, etc.

On September 16, 2016, Red Rock Radio announced that it would sell KGHS and KSDM to R & J Broadcasting as part of an eight station deal; the sale was completed on December 21, 2016.
