= KADU =

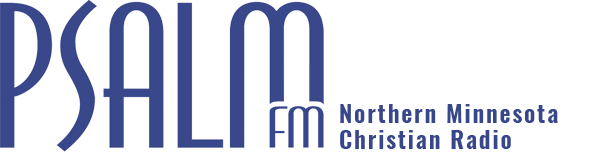
- Hibbing, Minnesota; United States
- Broadcast area: Iron Range
- Frequency: 90.1 MHz
- Branding: 90.1 Psalm FM

Programming
- Format: Christian
- Affiliations: Salem Communications, SRN News

Ownership
- Owner: Heartland Christian Broadcasters, Inc.
- Sister stations: KBHW, KXBR

Technical information
- Licensing authority: FCC
- Facility ID: 32377
- Class: A
- ERP: 1,500 watts
- HAAT: 103.0 meters (337.9 ft)
- Transmitter coordinates: 47°24′10″N 92°57′50″W

Links
- Public license information: Public file; LMS
- Webcast: Listen Live
- Website: psalmfm.org

KADU (90.1 FM) is a radio station licensed to Heartland Christian Broadcasters, INC. and located in Hibbing, Minnesota, United States. The station is owned by Heartland Christian Broadcasters, Inc.

== Translators ==
In addition to the main station, KADU is relayed by an additional translator to widen its broadcast area.

Call sign	Frequency	City of license	FID	ERP (W)	Class	FCC info
K236AD	95.1 FM	Grand Rapids, Minnesota	76210	17	D	LMS
