= Warsangali Sultanate =

1298–1886 northeastern Somali kingdom

Warsangali Sultanate Saldanadda Warsangali (Somali) سلطنة الورسنجلي (Arabic)
- 1613–1920
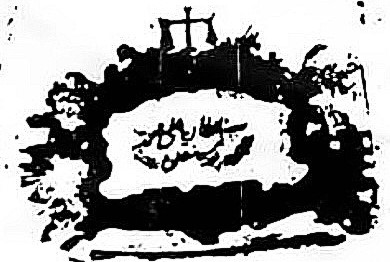
- Royal Arms of Maakhir

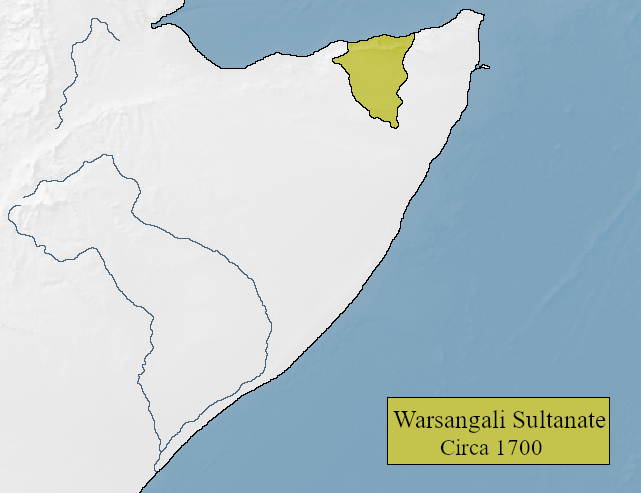
- The Warsangali Sultanate c. 1700.
- Capital: Durduri (1613-1740); Las Khorey (1740-1920)
- Common languages: Somali, Arabic
- Religion: Islam
- Government: Monarchy
- Sultan - Garaad (Lord)
  - 1613-1672: Garaad Abdulle Maḥmūd l
  - 1672-1694: Garaad Ali l
  - 1694-1721: Garaad Mohamed Nalaye l
  - 1721-1764: Garaad Mohamed ll
  - 1764-1804: Sultan Ali ll
  - 1804-1840: Sultan Maḥmūd ll
  - 1840-1890: Sultan Mohamed Awl lll
  - 1890-1910: Sultan Ali Shire lll
  - 1910-1920: Sultan Maḥmūd lll
- History
  - Established: 1613
  - Disestablished: 1920
Preceded by	Succeeded by
Adal Sultanate	British Somaliland
- Today part of: Somalia

The Warsangali Sultanate (Somali: Saldanadda Warsangeli) (Arabic: سلطنة الورسنجلي), was a Somali state established in the 17th century in the Maakhir region during the early modern period by militarized Garaads (Lords) of the Maakhir coast and the Cal-Madow Mountains. In the 17th century, these factions were united under a centralized authority by the descendants of Garaad (Lord) Abdullahi Dhidhin. The first supreme ruler of the state was Garaad (Lord) Abdulle Maḥmūd l (1613-1672). The administrative and economic capital was established at the port town of Durduri, this marked the beginning of a flourishing maritime state that dominated the frankincense and gum trade in the Gulf of Aden. The state continued to exist for nearly three centuries, ultimately collapsing in 1920.

== History, maritime trade, coastal fortifications, and warfare ==
The communities of Maakhir were predominantly agro-pastoralists whose livelihoods centered on date cultivation, camel herding, and the production of frankincense. The militarized Garaads (Lords) of different factions each maintained its own autonomous army, operating without centralized authority. During the 16th-century military campaigns of Imam Ahmad ibn Ibrahim al-Ghazi, the Garaads (Lords) of Maakhir contributed large fighting forces, with the bulk of troops coming from the coastal town of Maydh. Maakhir developed into a centralized polity during the reign of its first ruler, Garaad (Lord) Abdulle Maḥmūd I (1613–1672), whose rule marked the consolidation of political authority within the region.

The state did not appoint provincial governors. Instead, administration was carried out by local militarized Garaads (lords), who governed individual provinces and collected taxes on behalf of the supreme ruler. The ruler came from the royal Reer (family) Garaad lineage of the Dār al-Sanjalī dynasty (House of Warsangali).

From 1613 to 1764, the rulers bore the official title Garaad (Lord). In 1764, Ali ll Garaad Mohamed ll adopted the title Sultan upon succeeding his father. This change was largely administrative: Sultan appeared in official documents and correspondence, while the ruler continued to be locally referred to as Garaad.

During the reign of Sultan Maḥmūd lll (1910-1920), Sultan became the sole official title, formally replacing Garaad.

The Reer Garaad royal family descends from Garaad (lord) Abdullahi Dhidhin and belongs to the Dār al-Sanjalī dynasty (the House of Warsangali), which ruled the Maakhir State for approximately three centuries. These semi-nomadic nobles exercised authority over the Maakhir coast and mountain regions, consolidating power by subordinating other independent, militarized factions led by autonomous garaads (lords). In the early 17th century, Garaad Abdulle Maḥmūd l led military campaigns that led to the establishment of the Maakhir State in 1613, laying the political foundation for Warsangali rule in the region.

The Maakhir State was a hereditary monarchy. During the reign of Sultan Mohamed Awl III, two European travellers who visited his court in 1847 and 1848 recorded the following observations:

"The Quarsanguéli are divided into several families, of which the most important are the Guerad Abdallah, the sovereign family in which the title of Guerad is transmitted hereditarily."

"The Oor Singally are divided into several families, of whom the following are the most important: 1st, Gerad Abdullah, the royal branch, from which the title of Gerad descends by hereditary right."

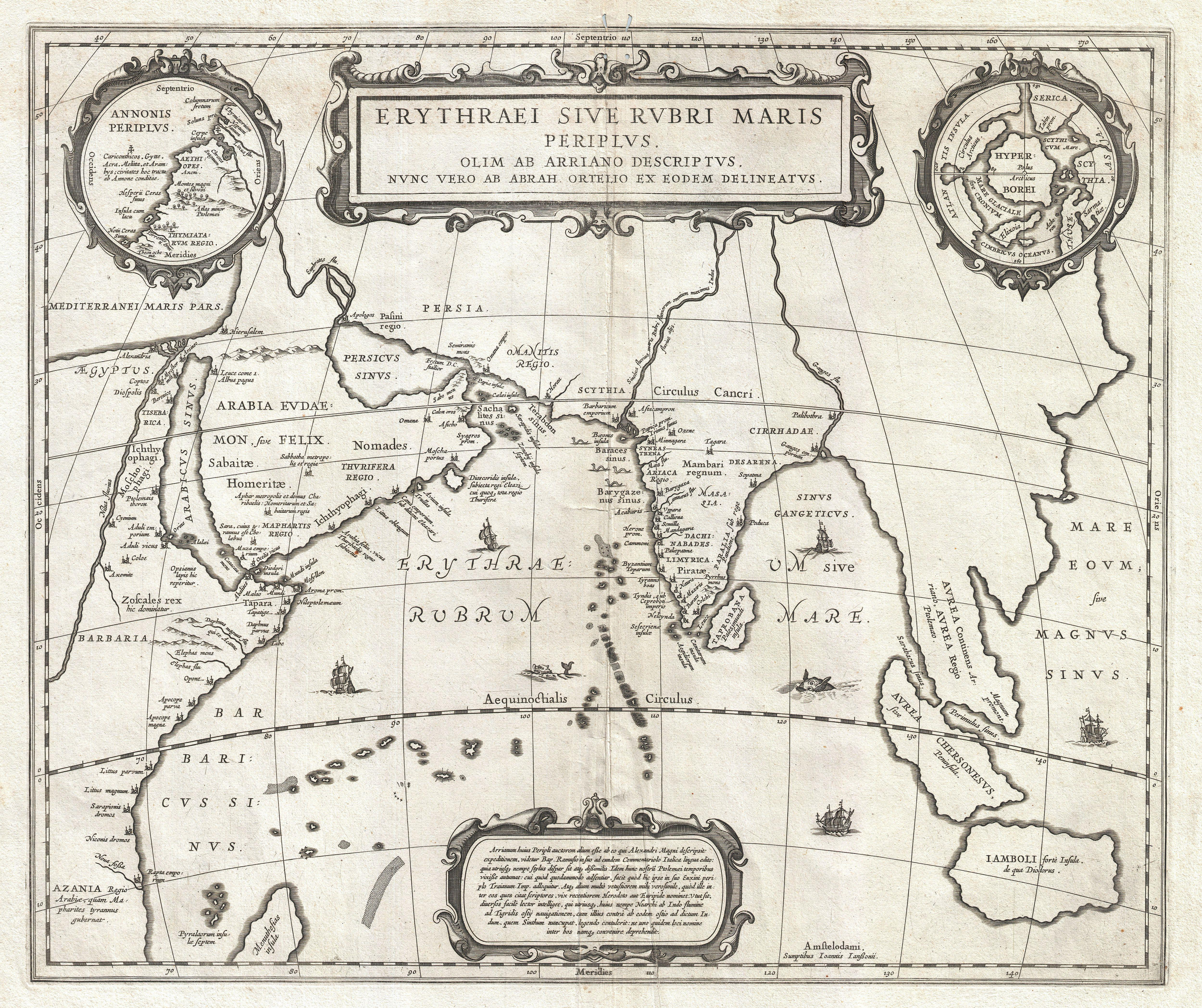
1658 map by the Dutch cartographer Jan Janssonius showing the capital, Durduri

In 1614, the Dutch cloth merchant Pieter van den Broecke visited the port of al-Shihr, where he recorded that a significant volume of trade originated from the Maakhir port of Durduri. He noted that Maakhir merchants exported large quantities of dates and frankincense to Arabian ports.

By the mid-17th century, the strategic importance of Durduri was reflected in European cartography. In 1658, a map of the Indian Ocean produced by the Dutch cartographer Jan Janssonius depicted the Maakhir port of Durduri, which at the time served as the capital of the newly established Warsangali state.

The state was primarily oriented toward maritime trade and controlled nine major ports: Durduri, Las Khorey, Ceelaayo, Hamar, Ras Gahm, Cadcadde, Dhaabgo, Geelwayta, and Waqdariya. These ports were protected by fortifications, some owned by merchant families under the authority of the ruler and others administered directly by the state. Maritime culture played a central role in Maakhir society, and trading vessels were constructed locally, particularly at Las Khorey.

The coastal domains of the Maakhir sultans extended from the far eastern port of Ceelaayo near Bandar Ziyada to the far western port of Bandar Jedid near Bandar Harshaw.

"The Oor Singally country extends from Bunder Zeeahdeh to Bunder Jedid."

Maritime commerce was closely tied to merchant-controlled fortifications. Maakhir merchants, some of whom owned coastal forts while others operated state fortifications in the service of the Sultan, played a dominant role in the frankincense trade. These merchants traveled to Arabia to acquire usage rights to frankincense trees and managed trade networks supplying Arabian and Indian ports. In addition to frankincense, Maakhir merchants exported gums, fertilizer, skins, timber, and livestock, forming a central component of the state’s maritime economy.

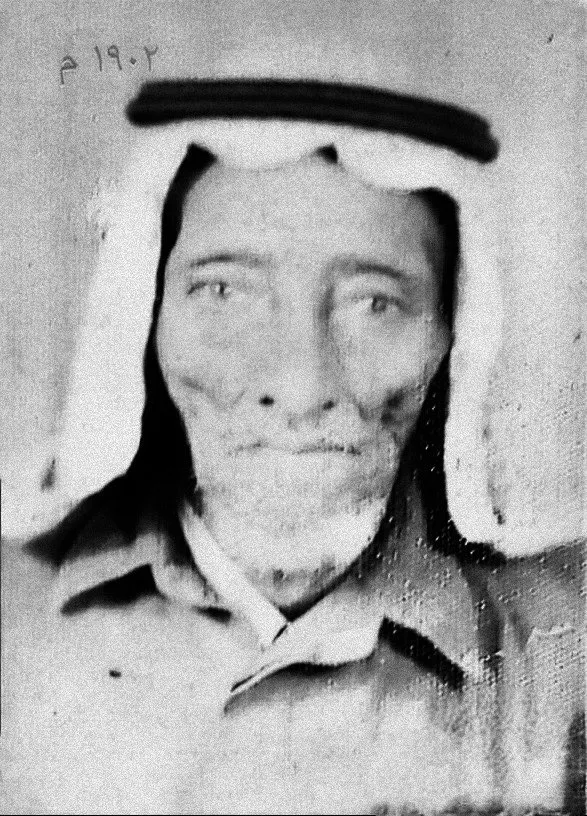
Shaykh Nūr bin Mohamed bin Ali, 19th-century wealthy Maakhiri frankincense merchant

From an early period, Maakhir merchants were shipowners and conducted a substantial share of trade across the Gulf of Aden alongside their allies, the merchants of the neighboring Kingdom of Murcanyo. This maritime trading alliance, formed through kinship ties and common ancestry, saw Maakhir and Murcanyo merchants dispatch their trading fleets jointly from the ports of Las Khorey and Murcanyo during the favorable monsoon trading season. Each season, the fleets undertook two trading voyages together.

In 1735, the merchant Shaykh Ali Maḥmūd Nuh founded the port of Las Qoray, constructing a water well (las), a mosque, and a fortress. Following the establishment of trade links with Swahili, Arabian, and Indian ports, Las Khorey rapidly developed into a major commercial center. During the reign of Garaad Mohamed ll (1721-1764), the state capital was transferred to Las Khorey, which became both the economic and administrative center of the state.

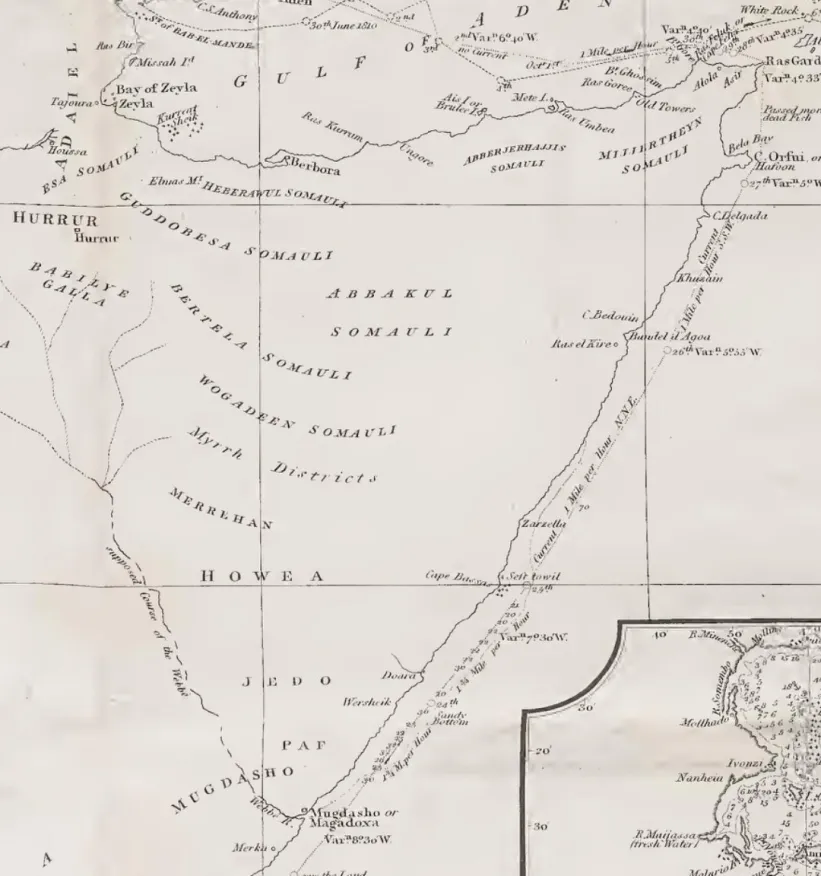
1809 map by Henry Salt showing the state capital (Las Khorey) labeled as “old towers”

From the reign of Garaad Mohamed ll through that of Sultan Maḥmūd II (1804-1840), trade at Las Khorey expanded significantly, accompanied by the construction of numerous fortifications. However, royal taxation on trade contributed to repeated local revolts. By 1809, a map by the British diplomat Henry Salt described Las Khorey as containing old towers (including castles and fortifications), many of which had been constructed during the 18th century but had fallen into partial disrepair due to warfare. Sultan Maḥmūd ll later undertook restoration efforts.

During the early reign of Sultan Mohamed Awl lll (1840-1890), renewed rebellions occurred. By 1854, Las Khorey reportedly contained nine fortifications, while Ceelaayo had three, Durduri five, and Ras Gahm one. Sultan Mohamed pursued assertive policies to re-establish central authority and preserve the state’s sovereignty.

In 1868, while Sultan Mohamed Awl III was actively working to re-establish central authority and suppress regional rebellions, a dispute arose between the Maakhir state and its longtime allies, the Kingdom of Murcanyo. The border between the two states was the port of Bandar Ziyada. Although the main port town of Bandar Ziyada was under Murcanyo’s control, the surrounding area was divided between the two states.

That year, Regent Nur sought to establish a new settlement on the coast near Bandar Ziyada, specifically at the mouth of the area’s perennial freshwater stream, a location noted for its rich resources. This led to a conflict, as Sultan Mohamed Awl III of Maakhir also laid claim to the stream, although neither state had previously built a settlement there, and the territory had been shared.

Sultan Mohamed Awl III allied with the Garaad (lord) of Nugaal, whose forces were the most heavily mounted in the region, bringing their combined troops to approximately five thousand. Both Sultan Mohamed Awl III’s and Regent Nur’s forces were armed with matchlocks; however, Regent Nur’s army was equipped with a greater number of firearms and fielded a relatively high proportion of them among the seven thousand troops under his command. The ensuing battle resulted in a decisive victory for Regent Nur, with the forces of Sultan Mohamed Awl III and the Garaad of Nugaal suffering heavy losses. Following the conflict, Regent Nur sent his troops south into Nugaal, killing an additional 600 in retaliation for the Garaad’s alliance with Maakhir.

This conflict, known as the Great War of the modern period in the northeastern Somali territories, was the largest battle in the region during this era. Following the war, Sultan Mohamed Awl III withdrew his forces, Regent Nur abandoned plans to establish the settlement, and the previous alliance between Maakhir, Murcanyo, and the Garaad of Nugaal was restored, bringing a period of peace to the area.

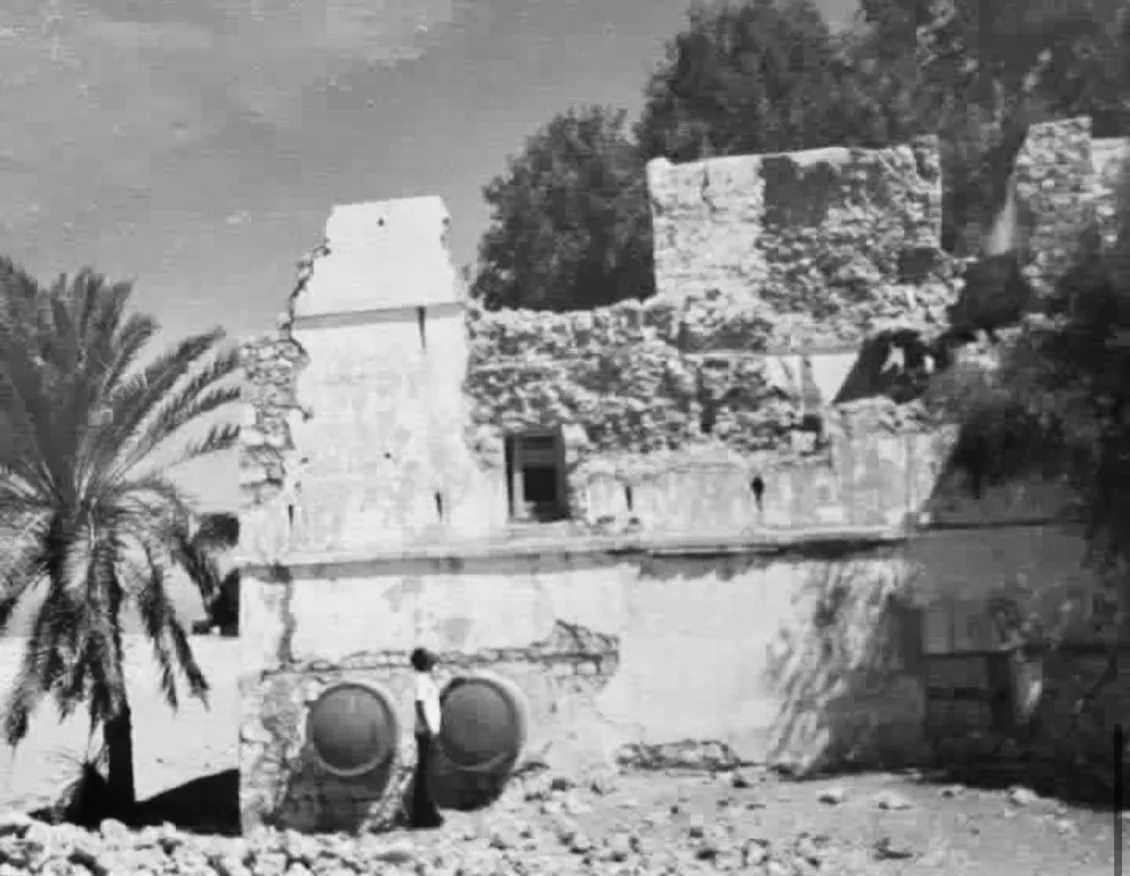
The 18th-century Maakhir royal palace (dār) in ruins, viewed from the western side

In 1870, the European traveler Richard Brenner made population estimates of the Maakhir coast, focusing on its largest coastal districts: Las Khorey, the capital and location of the royal palace; Durduri; and Waqdariya. He estimated the total population of these districts at roughly 12,000 inhabitants:

"Wak-deria, 30 English miles east of Meyet Island, with 2,000 inhabitants; Lasgori, residence of Sultan Mohamed Mahmud Ali of the Warsangali family, with 6,000 inhabitants; Durduri has 4,000 inhabitants, mainly Warsangali, as well as 50 Arabs from Makalle and 25 Banian merchants from Katsch."

In the 1870s, some rebellious factions that had opposed Sultan Mohamed Awl III fled to the port of Waqdariya and attempted to establish autonomous trade and authority by constructing three fortresses, while other rebel groups fled to Geelwayta. Despite these efforts, the port towns of Waqdariya and Geelwayta remained under state control, with Sultan Mohamed Awl III deploying state forces to reinforce royal authority over the fortresses in both ports. The state maintained naval superiority within its domain, regularly seizing vessels operating outside its authority. Contemporary accounts from 1855 note that state forces had previously defeated rival groups and confiscated their ships. Although European intervention, particularly from the British colony of Aden, limited the Sultan’s ability to project full naval power beyond state-controlled areas, it did not affect the state’s dominance along the coast under its direct authority. Observing this, the rebellious factions sought British support by attempting to establish relations with Aden.

Seeing that rebellious factions were attempting to establish relations with the British in order to undermine his rule, in 1872 Sultan Mohamed Awl III asserted his authority by capturing a British vessel sailing past his coast and seizing its cargo. This act was intended to demonstrate to the rebels that he exercised absolute control over his coastline, despite British efforts to weaken his position beyond his state borders through relations with neighboring groups.

In October 1882, Sultan Mohamed Awl III dispatched a fleet carrying state troops that attacked and destroyed Waqdariya. He prohibited all ships from entering the port and ordered the seizure of any ships attempting to do so. His forces were further instructed to confiscate any ships transporting goods to or from the area in support of rebel factions.

Following these actions, a rebel faction led by Maḥmūd Mohamed, Fari Mohamed, Mohamed Ahmed, Musa Abdulle, and Ali Samatar sent a letter in January 1883 to the British authorities in Aden seeking support. The rebels reported that Sultan Mohamed Awl III had threatened to intercept and plunder their ship at sea immediately after its departure from Aden, placing it in danger on waters under British control. They also claimed that the port of Waqdariya belonged to other families, not supported by contemporary authority. The letter stated:

“We are Somalis belonging to the family of Warsangali. Several years ago, we separated from this state and removed from their country, Lascori, and have since settled in Wagdaria, the port of Esa Habarta Hajis. About three months ago, the people of Warsangali, by order of their Sultan Mahomed Mahmood, attacked Wagdaria and plundered the place and burnt it. The Sultan also prohibited all ships from entering the port of Wagdaria, so we have bought a ship for our use, which we have laden with goods from Aden and we want to proceed with these goods to Wagdaria, but the said people threaten to intercept us and our ship on the sea and to rob it. We do not want to fight with them on the sea, but if they would attack us by land, we can defend ourselves, and as the sea is considered to be under the protection and sovereignty of the English."

After years of tension with the British in Aden, Sultan Mohamed Awl III, recognizing the rise of European colonial influence in Africa, decided that it would be advantageous for his state to have relations with the British over other powers at the time. Unlike other colonial policies, British engagement in the region was less intrusive and allowed for formal relations. As a result, Sultan Mohamed Awl III and the British negotiated several agreements, and in January 1886, a treaty was signed between Great Britain and the Maakhir state.

Maakhir merchants were active along the Eritrean Red Sea coast from at least the eighteenth century, integrated into long-standing Red Sea and western Indian Ocean trading networks. In 1840, the French traveler Antoine d’Abbadie recorded encountering Maakhir merchants in Massawa, then the principal port of the Eritrean coast. Among those he encountered was the Maakhir merchant Ali Fāhiye Warsame, whose lineage he recorded as descending from the Maakhir Garaad (lord) Yaʿqūb.

By the late nineteenth century, Maakhir's commercial activity had extended further along the southern Red Sea coast. In 1899, two Maakhir merchants put in at the port town of Eid, on the Danakil (Afar) coast, several kilometers north of Beilul, after being forced to seek shelter from adverse weather conditions. The two men subsequently settled in the town and married women from the local Afar population.

Tensions with segments of the local population escalated and resulted in an attempted poisoning of the two merchants, which led to the death of one of them. The surviving merchant returned to Maakhir and reported the incident to Sultan Ali Shire III. In response, the Sultan dispatched ten boatloads of troops to Eid. Upon their arrival, the local male population was killed. Eid thereafter became inhabited by the descendants of the Sultan’s troops, forming a Maakhir colony on the Eritrean coast.

On July 2, 1890, European colonial powers signed the General Act of Brussels, prohibiting the importation and trade of firearms in Africa. This regulation significantly affected the Somali coast, where European powers actively attempted to enforce it. The new ruler of Maakhir, Sultan Ali Shire III, the son and successor of Sultan Mohamed Awl III who died in 1890, viewed his state as independent from European laws and refused to comply with the arms prohibition.

In 1899, the anti-colonial Dervish movement was established under the leadership of Sayyid Muḥammad ibn ’Abdallāh Hassan. Sultan Ali Shire III not only established relations with the Dervishes but also strengthened ties by marrying his daughter Bullo to Sayyid Muḥammad and providing financial support. Earlier, in 1884, Urbeta, a merchant from the neighboring kingdom of Murcanyo, had begun an arms trading network supplying the Boqor Osman of Murcanyo. Recognizing the economic and strategic potential of the arms trade for defending his state, Sultan Ali Shire III developed a similar system in Maakhir. By the early 1900s, Maakhir merchants were operating as arms brokers in Arabia, acquiring large shipments for the state and supplying the Dervish leader and his son-in-law, Sayyid Muḥammad, creating a lucrative enterprise for the Maakhir state.

In letters dated 1901 and 1902, Sultan Ali Shire III of Maakhir corresponded with the authorities in Aden, having received several communications via al-nāhū (ship courier). In these letters, the Sultan expressed his disapproval of unauthorized entry into his territories, emphasizing that anyone wishing to visit Maakhir must seek prior permission from the state. Visitors who obtained authorization were to be treated with justice and fairness and provided with an abān (host and protector), whereas those entering secretly or without consent would be held accountable under the laws of the state. Sultan Ali III instructed the authorities in Aden to warn their subjects against entering Maakhir without prior communication and to refrain from sending individuals on diplomatic missions without official approval from the Maakhir state.

The Sultan further affirmed that all residents of the Maakhir coast and territories were under the authority and protection of his state, and that no foreign power had jurisdiction over them. Any dealings or relations with his subjects required explicit authorization from the Maakhir state. He emphasized that all people within his territories whether locals or foreigners were to be treated according to the laws of Maakhir, with justice and hospitality. Those entering peacefully were guaranteed safety, while those arriving with hostile intent would bear responsibility for their actions. All official communications from Aden or elsewhere were to be conducted directly through the Maakhir state.

Sultan Ali Shire III also noted that some individuals had entered his territory without permission and engaged in activities involving arms and trade. He clarified that the carrying of weapons and the conduct of trade within Maakhir were strictly regulated and permitted only with his explicit approval. The letters concluded with a reaffirmation of the Sultan and his officials’ position, asserting their authority and invoking God as witness to their statements.

Letter of Sultan Ali III Maḥmūd II, dated 16 Rabīʿ al-Awwal 1320 AH (23 June 1902 CE)

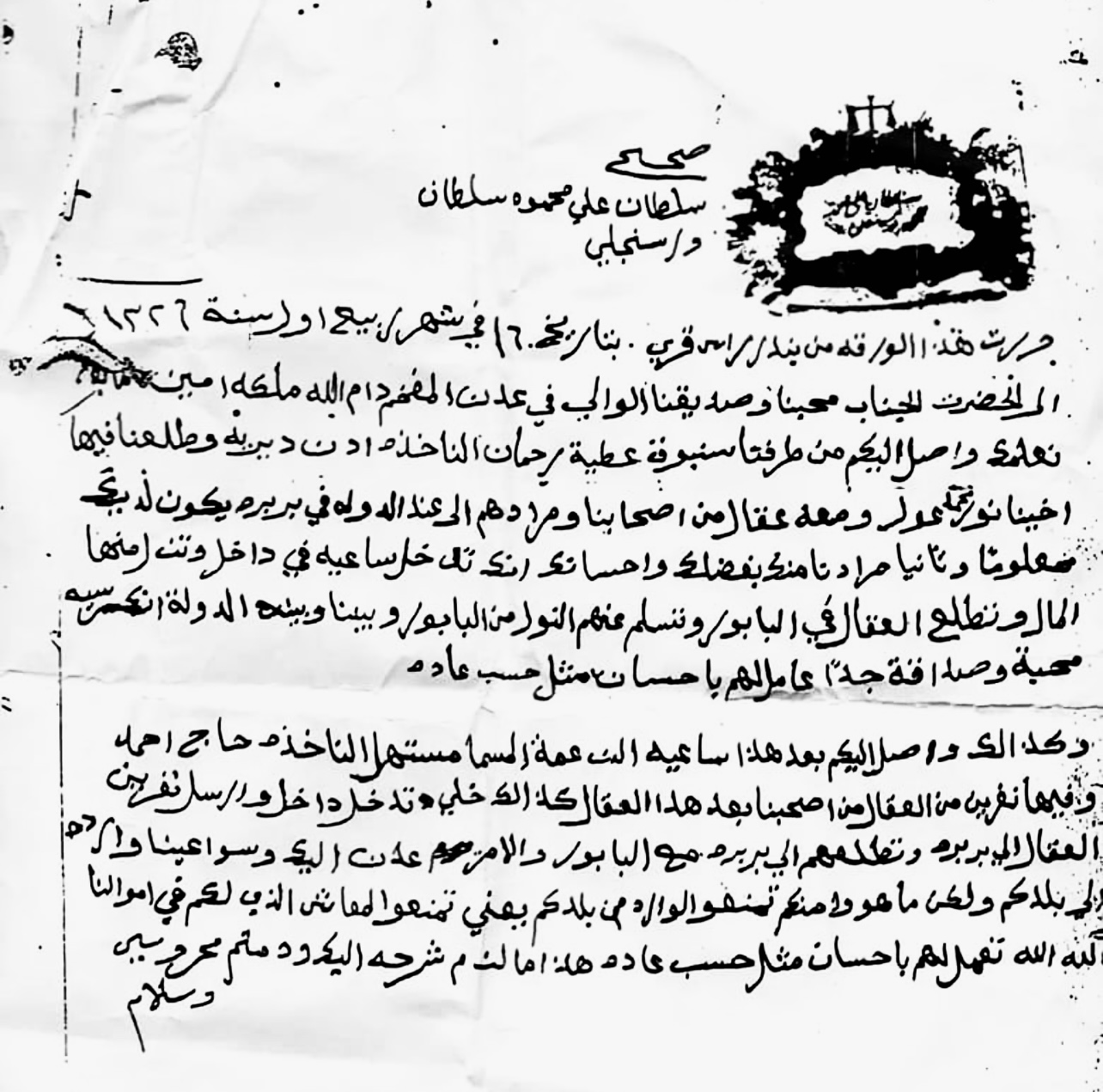
Official instrument of authority of ʿAli Maḥmūd, Sultan of the Warsangali, 1902

"Praise be to God alone.

Official instrument of authority of ʿAli Maḥmūd, Sultan of the Warsangali, on the 16th of Rabīʿ al-Awwal, year 1320 AH.

"We inform you that we have received your letter and understood what it contained. You mentioned that you had written to us on several occasions, but we received only the letter which was delivered to us by the courier. We thank you for your friendly intentions toward us and for what you sent, and we accept it with goodwill. We make it known to you that the people who reside in our territory and along our coast are under our authority, and that no one has the right to interfere with them without our permission. We have instructed that those who come peacefully are to be treated with fairness and customary hospitality, and that no injustice is to be committed against anyone. Whoever enters our land with good intent shall be secure, and whoever enters with ill intent shall bear the consequences of his actions. We expect that matters concerning our country be conducted through us directly, so that order may be maintained and misunderstanding avoided. This is what we wished to make known, and God is witness over what we say. Peace."

Letter of Sultan Ali III Maḥmūd II, dated 1319 AH (1901)

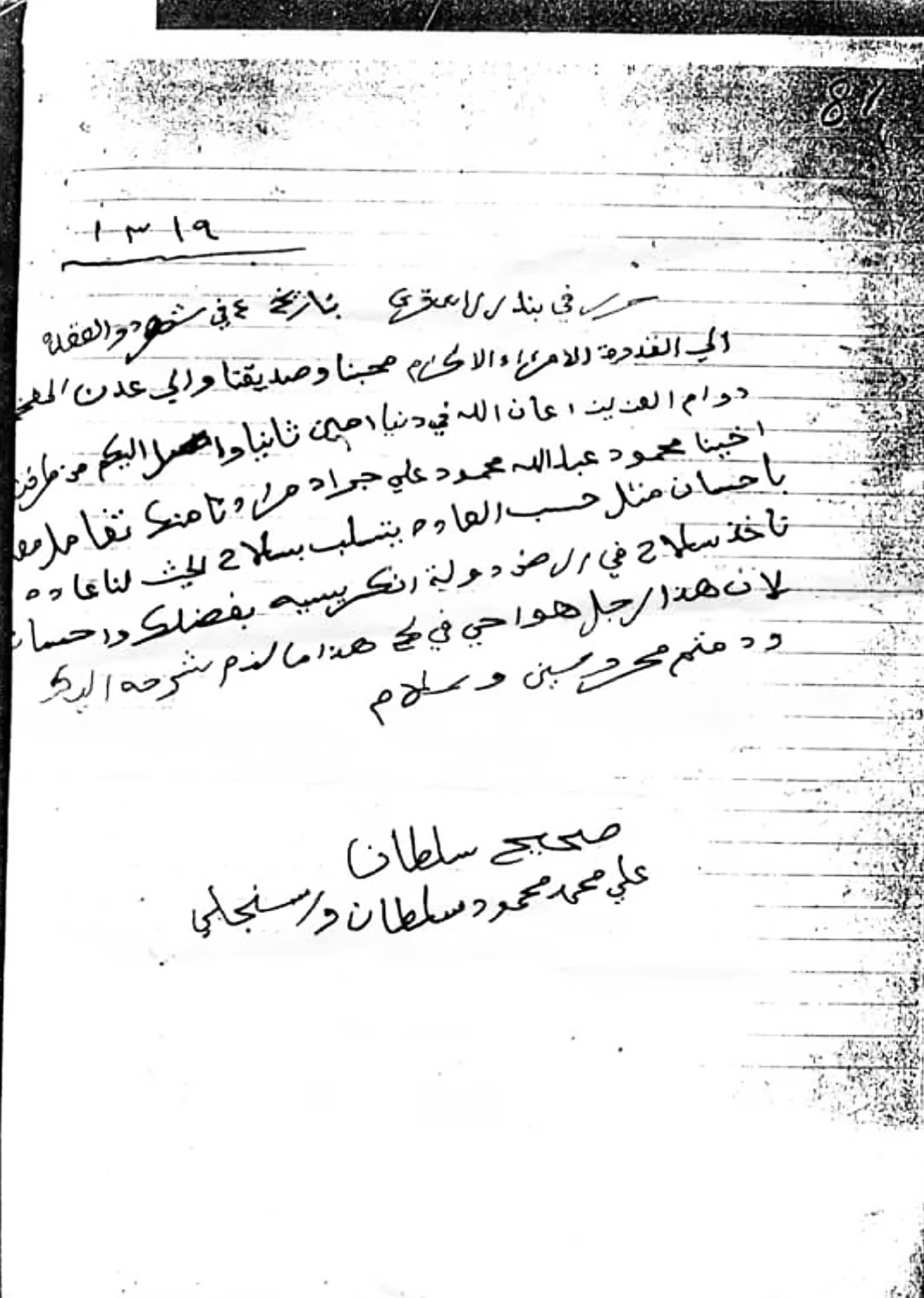
Official instrument of authority of ʿAli Maḥmūd, Sultan of the Warsangali, 1901

"In the Name of God, the Most Merciful, the Most Compassionate.

From ʿAli Maḥmūd, Sultan of the Warsangali,

To those concerned in Aden, May God guide you. We write to inform you that we have learned of certain persons who have entered our territory without authorization and have engaged in activities concerning weapons and commerce. We state clearly that no one is permitted to carry weapons or conduct trade in our land except with our knowledge and approval. This land is under our authority and is inherited from our forefathers, and we do not accept interference in its internal affairs. Whoever comes openly and seeks permission shall be treated with justice and fairness. As for those who enter secretly or act without consent, they will be held accountable according to what is customary and lawful among us. We therefore request that you notify those under your authority not to send anyone into our land without first communicating with us. This clarification is made so that no dispute or misunderstanding may arise afterward.

Written by

ʿAli Maḥmūd, Sultan of the Warsangali

Peace."

By 1907, British officials were actively monitoring Sultan Ali Shire III’s state-sponsored arms trade. Reports noted that most arms, ammunition, food, and cloth supplied to the Dervishes originated from Maakhir’s capital port, Las Khorey. The British Navy, operating from Berbera, was ordered to search all Maakhir ships and vessels docked in Maakhir ports.

"It is open to question whether the Mulla obtains arms or ammunition through the Warsangli port of Las Khorai. The present friendly intercourse between the Warsangli and the Dervishes is probably more of a commercial than of a political nature. To the disadvantages of Illig as a port of call for native craft, the Mulla finds it more convenient to obtain his food and clothing supplies from Las Khorai, which has a long-established and direct trade with Aden and other Arabian ports. Every possible precaution is taken by both traffic. The Warsangli Sultan has been frequently warned of the consequences of importing arms and ammunition, and the Protectorate armed dhows search all native craft putting in at Warsangli ports."

Despite these warnings and the British naval blockade of the Maakhir coast in 1909, Sultan Ali III and his merchants continued the arms trade. By this time, three of the four largest Somali arms brokers in the port of Aden were Maakhir merchants in service of Sultan Ali III.

"There are four principal brokers in Aden, one a Mijjertein named Haji Abdi Matan, Warbaneya, and three Warsangli."

Later, in 1910, Sultan Ali Shire III retired to his royal palace in Las Khorey and transferred power to his twenty-year-old son, Maḥmūd III. British authorities were particularly incensed by this succession, as Maḥmūd III continued his father’s support for the Dervish movement. Contemporary British documents express frustration and disapproval of Sultan Ali Shire III, reflecting the clash between colonial ambitions and Maakhir’s assertion of independence.

== Art and Inscribed Heritage ==
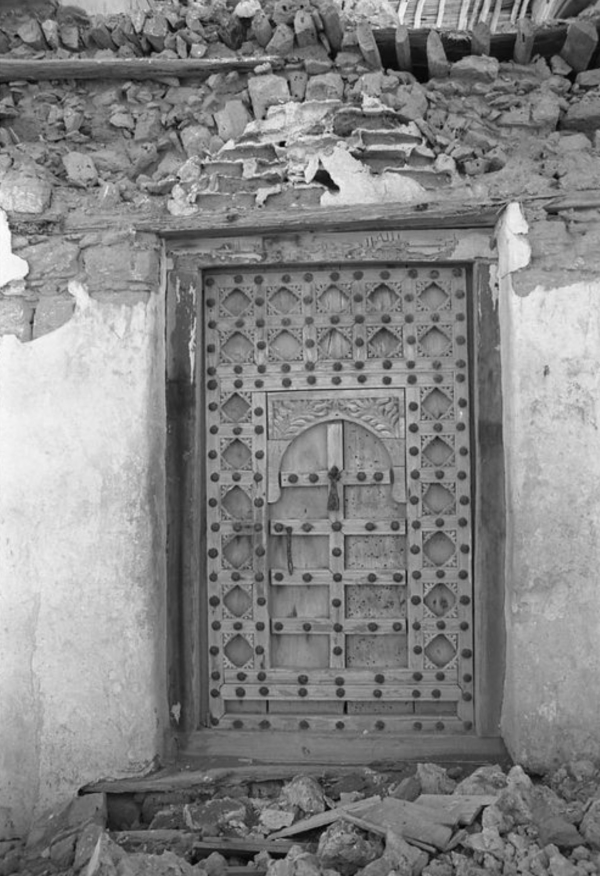
18th-century merchant property at Ceelaayo port town, carved wooden door inscribed "In the name of Allah, the Most Gracious, the Most Merciful."
