= Humanitarian Cluster System =

Disaster response coordination mechanism

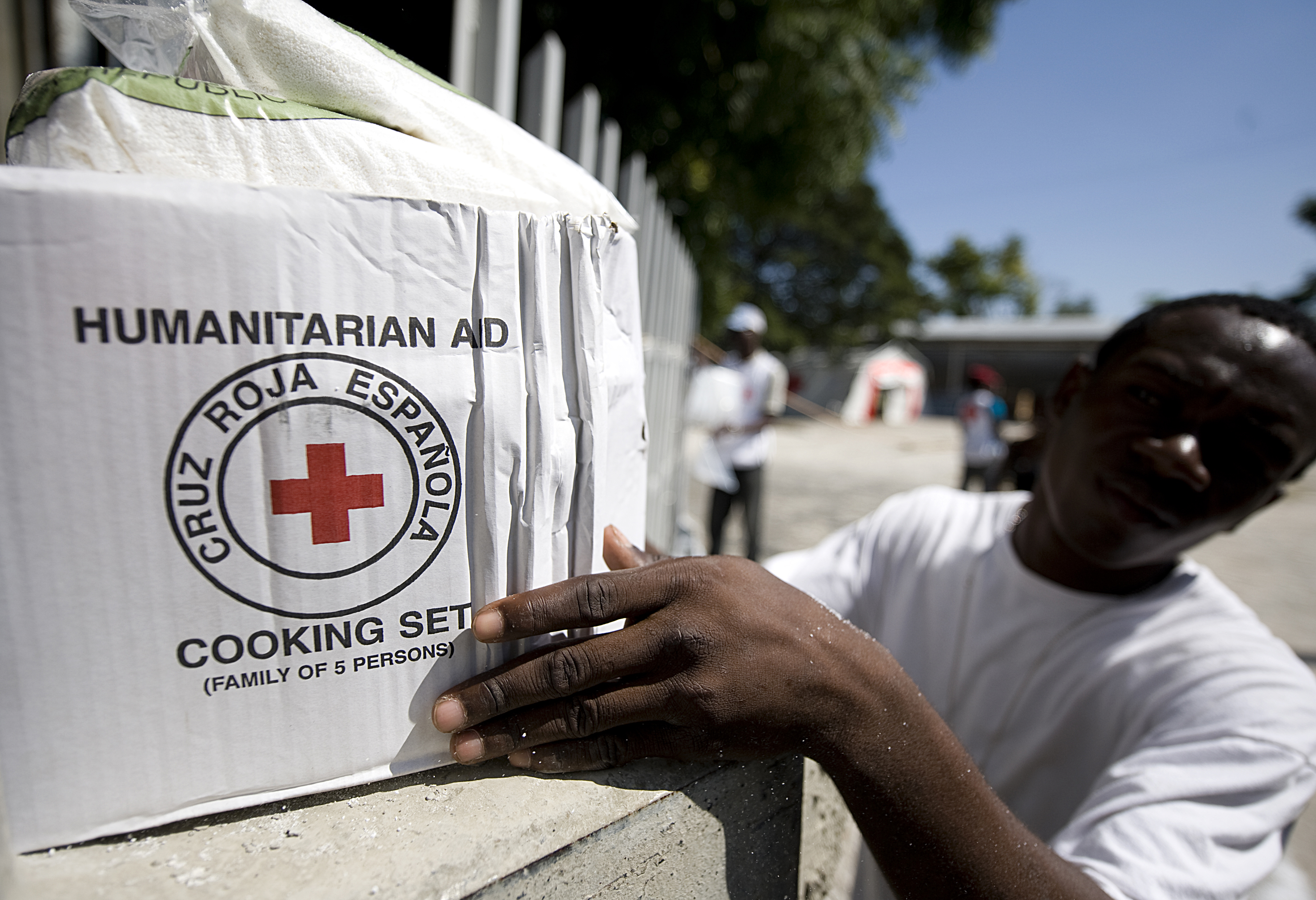
Humanitarian aid being distributed in Haiti

The Humanitarian Cluster System is a system, used by the United Nations Office for the Coordination of Humanitarian Affairs, to coordinate multi-agency responses to large humanitarian emergencies.

The system has been used since 2005 to improve the quality of humanitarian aid delivery. The cluster system categorizes humanization activities into eleven work areas, and four cross-cutting themes, and identifies coordinating organizations for each of them.

The coordination system has improved some aspects of humanitarian responses, and while it empowers international organizations, it also excludes local and national organizations, contrary to the widely accepted localisation agenda.

== History ==
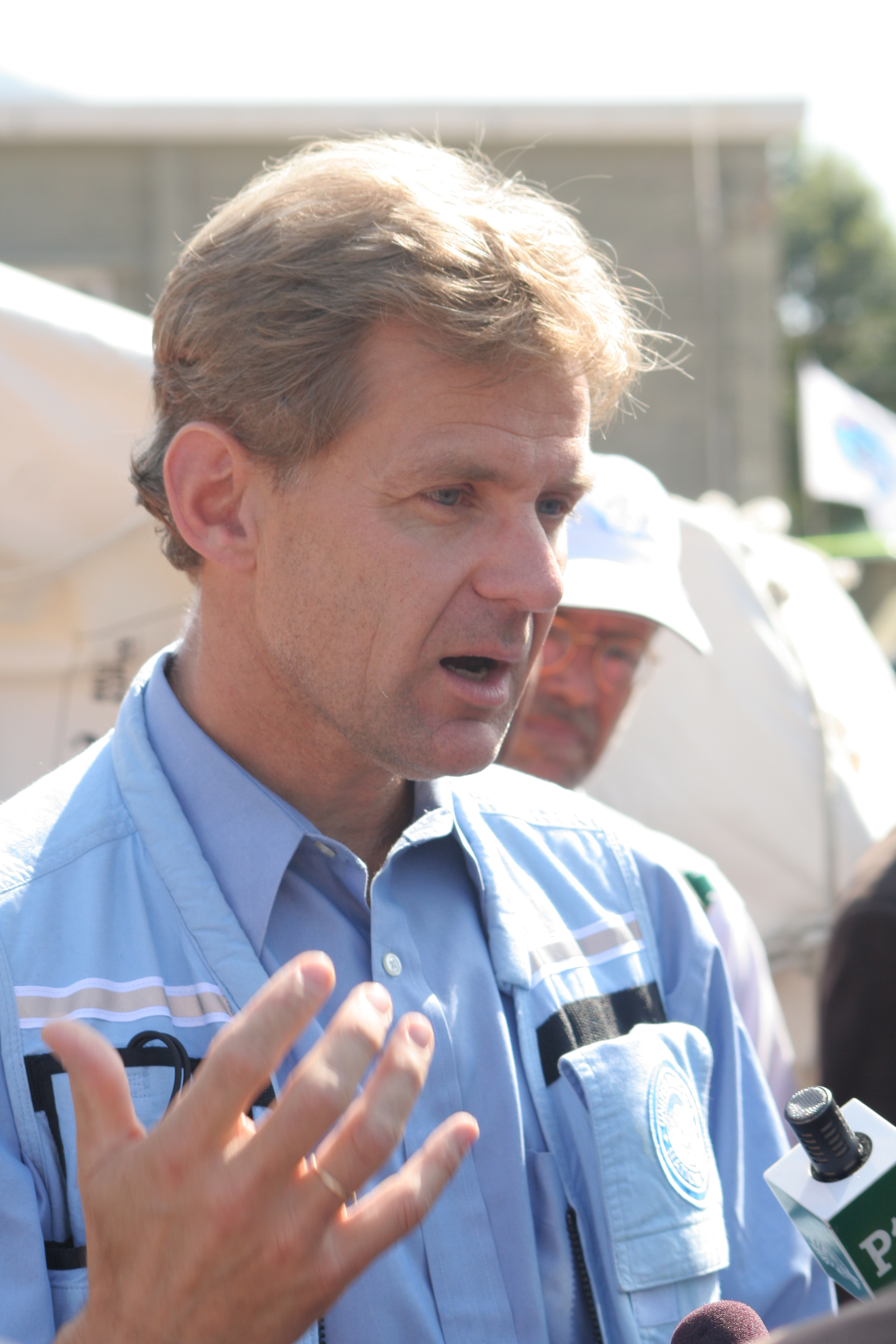
Jan Egeland in Pakistan

In 2004, Jan Egeland, the United Nations (UN) Emergency Response Coordinator commissioned a review of the operation of the international humanitarian system, known as the Humanitarian Reform Agenda. The review identified gaps in coordination between United Nations, Red Cross and non-governmental humanitarian aid organizations.

As a result of recommendations from that review, the cluster system was introduced in December 2005 to address the lack of coordination. The cluster system was first used in response to the 2005 Kashmir earthquake.

== Clusters and cross cutting themes ==
The clusters are defined and categorized by the Inter-Agency Standing Committee. Each of the eleven clusters has one UN institution as a coordinator, with some having a secondary United Nations or non-UN coordinator, as follows:

Eleven United Nations Clusters and their coordinating institution(s)
Cluster	Coordinating Institution(s)	Type
Camp Coordination and Camp Management	International Organization for Migration, and the United Nations High Commissioner for Refugees	Response
Early Recovery	United Nations Development Programme	Response
Education	UNICEF and Save the Children	Response
Emergency Telecommunications	World Food Programme	Service
Food Security	World Food Programme and Food and Agriculture Organization	Response
Health	World Health Organization	Response
Logistics	World Food Programme	Service
Nutrition	UNICEF	Response
Protection	United Nations High Commissioner for Refugees	Response
Shelter	International Federation of Red Cross and Red Crescent Societies and the United Nations High Commissioner for Refugees	Response
Water, Sanitation and Hygiene for Health	UNICEF	Response

Clusters coordination is done by at meetings chaired by the coordination institution (above) as frequently as deemed necessary during an emergency: as often as daily or as infrequently as quarterly.

In addition to the eleven clusters, there are four identified cross-cutting themes, each with a coordinating agency or agencies, as follows:

Four Cross Cutting issues
Issue	Coordinating institution(s)
Age	HelpAge International
Environment	United Nations Environment Programme
Gender	Which ever two agencies co-chair the Inter-Agency Standing Committee sub-working group on gender
HIV/AIDS	UNAIDS

== Cluster coordination ==
The purpose of cluster meetings is for agencies to share information, including information about unmet humanitarian needs, and for cluster coordinators share relevant information and standards to attendees. Clusters coordinators also coordinate fundraising for their respective humanitarian aid sector. Between the 2005 launch and the 2010 assessment, the cluster coordination mechanism had raised US$57 million through the cluster system, representing less than 1% of total fundraising for the institutions during that period.

Cluster coordination always occurs at a global level, national level, and local level and sometimes happens regionally or provincially depending on the specific circumstances of the emergency.

== Critique ==
=== Advantages of the cluster system ===
A 2010 independent assessment of the cluster system found that the use of the cluster system has improved the humanitarian response to gender-based violence, inclusion of people with disabilities, child protection, nutrition, water and sanitation in some countries. Use of the cluster system improved the participating organizations' ability to identify gaps in humanitarian needs, and avoid duplication of efforts. Use of the cluster system increased the rate of learning between organizations, and improved the coordination of efforts due to an increase in the predictability of each other's actions. The amount of collaboration between United Nations and non-UN organizations improved as a result of the use of the cluster system.

=== Criticisms of the cluster system ===
Despite localisation aspirations, the cluster system centers around international humanitarian agencies, and excludes local and national organizations from coordination activities. Use of the cluster system challenges the humanitarian principle of independence requiring humanitarian organizations to operate with independence from governments. Poor coordination of clusters prevents activities from reaching their maximum potential, and many of the coordinators working in clusters lack the necessary skills. Coordination between clusters is absent or weak, resulting in the compromised responses to issues that are relevant to more than one cluster. Cluster members may face challenges for secured financial independence from cluster or lead organizations. Another issue that potentially hinders services includes the maintenance of relationships with various forces and actors involved in conflicts. Inadequate facilitation training of many coordinators, and limited time on coordination at the sub-national level are reported as some of the issues that could prevent clusters from reaching their full potential.
