= Humanitarian protection =

Humanitarian activity

Humanitarian protection is the act of promoting and ensuring the legal rights of people affected by humanitarian crises.

The concept of humanitarian protection was established by the 1949 Geneva Conventions and responsibility to ensure protection was mandated to the International Committee of the Red Cross. Outside of times of crises, national governments tend to have responsibility to ensure that people's rights are protected, but during humanitarian emergencies aid agencies often perform the task. Humanitarian protection by non-governmental agencies is coordinated by the United Nations High Commissioner for Refugees.

A growing unmet need for humanitarian protection was identified in 2015, exacerbated by a major gap in donor-funding of humanitarian protection activities.

== History and definition ==
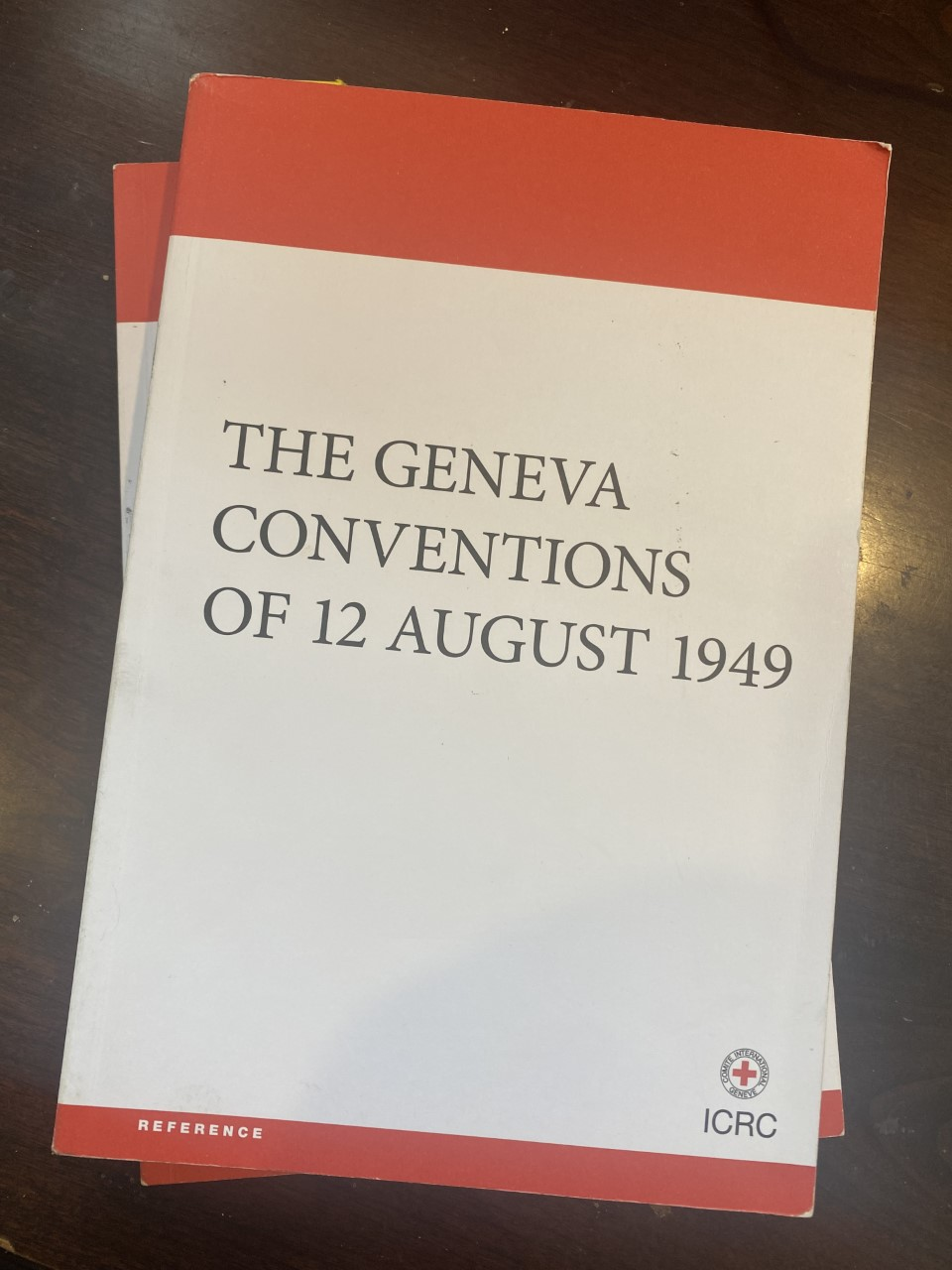
The Geneva Conventions of 1949

In the aftermath of the Second World War, the 1949 Geneva Conventions made clear that combatants must protect civilians from harm, although the conventions did not explicitly define protection as a humanitarian activity. Protection as a humanitarian concept was introduced in the 1952 Statutes of the International Red Cross and Red Crescent Movement which categorised all humanitarian activities into assistance or protection.

Until the 1990s, protection was considered predominately a legal issue, but after the legal mechanisms and United Nations peacekeepers both failed to protect people from atrocities in Somalia, Bosnia, Rwanda, humanitarian agencies began to consider protection to be part of their mandate. Humanitarian protection was subsequently debated at the United Nations, and the International Criminal Court issued an arrest warrant for Sudanese president Omar al-Bashir in response to his government's killing of civilians. United Nations Security Council Resolution 1296 of April 19, 2000 noted that most victims of armed conflict were civilians and introduced steps to enhance their protection.

In 2008, the International Committee of the Red Cross's (ICRC) Protection Policy categorised protection into four types: political protection, military or security protection, legal and judicial protection, and humanitarian protection. The ICRC policy defines humanitarian protection as: ensuring authorities and others in power respect their own obligations to preserve the physical integrity, safety and dignity of people affected by conflict and violence. Protection activities include efforts to prevent or stop breaches of international humanitarian law and other relevant legislation.

== Organization of protection activities ==
Ordinarily, ensuring the rights of civilians is the activity of national governments, however the consequences of humanitarian emergencies or actions and omissions by governments may leave civilians in need of protection. Humanitarian protection needs tend to arise in times of armed conflict, civil unrest, and in the aftermath of natural disasters.

In the United Nations humanitarian cluster system, protection is one the eleven defined types of activity. While some legal and advocacy activities are the specific mandate the International Committee of the Red Cross, most protection activities are coordinated by United Nations High Commissioner for Refugees through its leadership of the Global Protection Cluster.

The primary activities that humanitarian aid actors undertake with regards to protection relate to: refugee law; protection of children; sexual and gender based violence; land, property and housing rights; and land mine issues.

=== United Nations-coordinated protection activities ===
The United Nations High Commissioner for Refugees leads the Global Protection Cluster, which has appointed one humanitarian agency as the focal point for each of the four areas of responsibilities:

Humanitarian Protection Cluster Activity Coordination
Area of Responsibility	Agency
Protection of children	UNICEF
Sexual and gender based violence	United Nations Population Fund
Land, property and housing rights	Norwegian Refugee Council
Land mine action	United Nations Mine Action Service

Humanitarian activities relating to the protection of children include the provision of safe spaces for playing and learning. Regarding sexual and gender based violence, activities include support to health care, law enforcement, and judicial systems to support victims and the discouragement of perpetrators. To support displaced people, temporary shelter that protects people from the environment and from violence is often provided.

=== United Nation clusters and coordinating institutions ===
Major categories of the United Nations Clusters include refugee camp coordination and management, early recovery, education, emergency telecommunication, food security, health, logistics, nutrition, protection, shelter and water, sanitation, and hygiene for health. In addition to the key United Nations Institutions, World Food Program, Food and Agriculture Organization, World Health Organization, and Red Crescent Societies participate in providing responses and in coordinating services.

=== Red Cross-led activities ===
International Committee of the Red Cross emblem

The Geneva Conventions identify the International Committee of the Red Cross as the "guardian" of International Humanitarian Law. The International Committee of the Red Cross works to improve and create humanitarian protection laws and to encourage compliance International Humanitarian Law amongst combatants.

== Importance and effectiveness of humanitarian protection ==
ALNAP's 2015 State of the Humanitarian System report identified protection both as the principle need for many of the growing number of people affected by humanitarian crises, and the area where the humanitarian system was least effective.The report identified protection as the poorest funded of the various humanitarian activities, noting that only 30% of requests from humanitarian agencies to fund protection activities were met by donors.

Norwegian Refugee Council's 2015 report Independent Whole of System Review of Protection in the Context of Humanitarian Action identified "a significant gap between rhetoric and reality on protection." The amount spent by United Nations agencies on protection is significantly less than no food and water provision.

Between 2015 and 2017, the need for humanitarian protection increased, but critiques of the ability of some of the larger humanitarian aid agencies to meet them identified both successes and failures.

== Relevance of legal framework post-WWII ==
International Humanitarian Law was written when it was easier to distinguish military from civilians and was also written with the assumption that there was little military advantage to attacking civilian targets. These assumptions have become decreasingly accurate since the Second World War, as warring parties have increasingly deliberately targeted civilians and as the distinction between civilians and warring parties has become more opaque.

As humanitarian actors and civilians have increasingly become targets in conflict, protection activities have modernised to include greater emphasis on international humanitarian law compliance, plus wider efforts to bolder international justice institutions. Legislation such as 1951 Convention Relating to the Status of Refugees, the 1979 Convention on the Elimination of all Forms of Discrimination against Women, the 1984 United Nations Convention against Torture, the 1989 Convention on the Rights of the Child, and the 1997 Ottawa Landmines Treaty have been used to improve humanitarian protection.

The increasing use of lethal autonomous weapons (also known as killer robots) and use of unmanned combat aerial vehicles (also known as drones) technologies present major obstacles to the future protection of civilians in conflict zones.

== See also ==
- Attacks on humanitarian workers
- Humanitarian aid
