= My Hero Is You =

Children's storybook

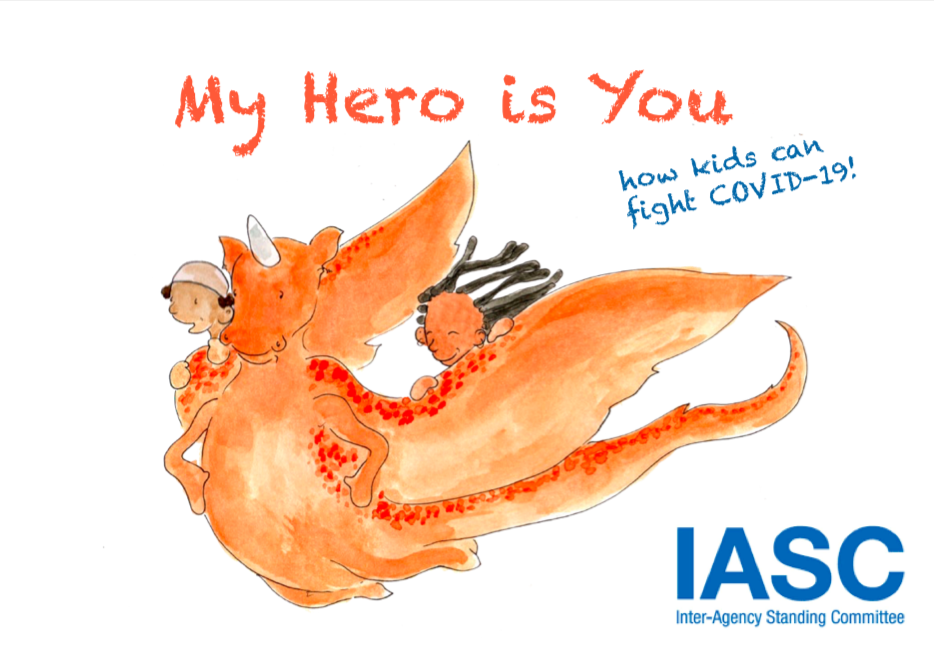
- Cover of the English version (2020)
- Illustrator: Helen Patuck
- Language: >135 languages
- Subject: COVID-19, Mental Health
- Genre: literature, fantasy, children's book, adventure
- Publisher: Inter-Agency Standing Committee
- Publication date: 31 March 2020

My Hero Is You is a children's storybook developed by the Inter-Agency Standing Committee (IASC) Reference Group on Mental Health and Psychosocial Support in Emergency Settings (IASC MHPSS RG). The storybook aims to support young children in coping with stressors and worries related to COVID-19. The World Health Organization officially launched the book on April 9, 2020. The book is freely available and can be accessed online.

== Background ==
The project was supported by global, regional and country-based experts from Member Agencies of the IASC MHPSS RG, in addition to parents, caregivers, teachers and children in 104 countries. A global survey was distributed in Arabic, English, Italian, French and Spanish to assess children's mental health and psychosocial needs during the COVID-19 pandemic. A framework of topics to be addressed through the story was developed using the survey results. The book was shared through storytelling to children in several countries affected by COVID-19. Feedback from children, parents and caregivers was then used to review and update the story. Over 1,700 children, parents, caregivers and teachers worldwide provided input by sharing how they were coping with the COVID-19 pandemic.

== Translations and adaptations ==
To date, more than 135 languages translations are published online. NGOs, international organisations, universities and governments produced adaptations of derivative products in different formats and languages. The storybook is adapted to audio files, YouTube movies, braille transcripts, radio broadcasts and educational materials.
