= The State of the Humanitarian System =

Report about humanitarian aid

- Authors: 2010: Paul Harvey, Abby Stoddard, Adele Harmer, Glyn Taylor, Victoria DiDomenico, and Lauren Brander; 2012: Glyn Taylor, Abby Stoddard, Adele Harmer, Katherine Haver, Paul Harvey, Kathryn Barber, Lisa Schreter, Constance Wilhelm; 2015: Abby Stoddard, Adele Harmer, Katherine Haver, Glyn Taylor, Paul Harvey; 2018: Paul Knox Clarke and Alice Obrecht
- Subjects: Humanitarian Aid; Humanitarian principles
- Published: 2010, 2012, 2015, 2018
- Publisher: ALNAP
- Publication place: UK

The State of the Humanitarian System is a recurring report that was first published by ALNAP in 2010. It is updated every two or three years.

The report summarizes the humanitarian system and analyzes successes and failures in the delivery of humanitarian aid, with frequent comparison against humanitarian principles.

Four editions have been published. Recurring themes in the reports include an absence of localisation, low levels of consultation with the communities affected by humanitarian crises, and insufficient funding. The reports have generally noted cans in the sufficiency, efficiency, relevance and appropriateness of humanitarian aid with modest improvements over the years.

== Editions ==
=== First, 2010 edition ===
==== Publication ====
The first edition, labeled as a pilot, was written by Paul Harvey, Abby Stoddard, Adele Harmer, Glyn Taylor, Victoria DiDomenico, and Lauren Brander.

==== Synopsis ====
The 2010 pilot edition highlighted reduced respect for humanitarian principles from local governments. It states that evaluations of humanitarian interventions do not sufficiently include the input from the people served by the interventions and called for increased participation.

It criticized the coordination in the humanitarian cluster system for being weak and reported non-governmental organizations (NGO) fears of the cluster system being expanded in its role to include monitoring and evaluation of humanitarian responses.

The report noted that there are 4,400 humanitarian NGOs, 64% being national organizations, 18% being international in scope, but that the sector was being dominated by a small number of large NGOs, five of which represent 38% of all spending. The top five being Médecins Sans Frontières, Catholic Relief Services, Oxfam, Save the Children, and World Vision.

=== Second, 2012 edition ===
==== Publication ====
The 2012 edition was a collaboration between ALNAP and the Overseas Development Institute written by Glyn Taylor as the lead author with support from colleagues Abby Stoddard, Adele Harmer, Katherine Haver, and Paul Harvey at consulting firm Humanitarian Outcomes and also Kathryn Barber, Lisa Schreter, and Constance Wilhelm.

==== Synopsis ====
Building on data from 2010, the report provides a wide analysis of the humanitarian system. It notes slow and steady growth in human resources, modest increasing in funding but the continued massive funding shortfalls leading to gaps in provision of humanitarian aid. It notes modest improvements in the relevant and appropriateness of humanitarian aid, inconsistent levels of effectiveness, and zero improvements in efficiency and innovations.

=== Third, 2015 edition ===
==== Publication ====
The 2015 edition was written by team lead Abby Stoddard, and also Adele Harmer, Katherine Haver, Glyn Taylor, and Paul Harvey. Additional supporting research was undertaken by Morgan Hughes, Kate Toth, Elisabeth Couture, Amanda Stone, Kelly Chan, Clare Hymes, and Kaitlyn Vott.

==== Synopsis ====
The report found that aid agencies are struggling to reach people in conflict zones. While the number of humanitarian emergencies between 2012 and 2015 had reduced, the number of people with unmet needs had significantly increased, up by 78% compared to 2007-2008 levels. Violence in Central African Republic, Mali, and South Sudan created needs that aid agencies failed to meet. The report described a lack of technical capacity, recruitment challenges and a funding shortfall as the reasons for the gaps.

While the report praised the responses to Typhoon Haiyan and other natural diseases, it spoke of the impossibility of verifying humanitarian needs, or aid delivery in Syria.

The report noted a lack of engagement with the local community and 70% of aid going to United Nations and the Red Cross Movement. A 46% shortfall between funds needed to respond to the Syria Civil War was reported.

=== Fourth, 2018 edition ===
==== Publication ====
The 2018 edition was written by Abby Stoddard and Paul Harvey.

==== Synopsis ====
The report found limited improvements with regards to participation of communicatees affected by humanitarian crisis and limited improvement with accountability to populations. Community feedback was not done in a meaningful way. Aid recipients did report higher satisfaction with humanitarian aid than in 2012.

The provenance of sexual exploitation and abuse highlighted the poor accountability and weak reporting mechanisms.

== Trends ==
The reports have highlighted gaps in the sufficiency of humanitarian responses, the effectiveness, the relevance and appropriateness. Coordination has slightly improved.

== See also ==
- Localisation
