= Humanitarian aid =

Material or logistical assistance for people in need

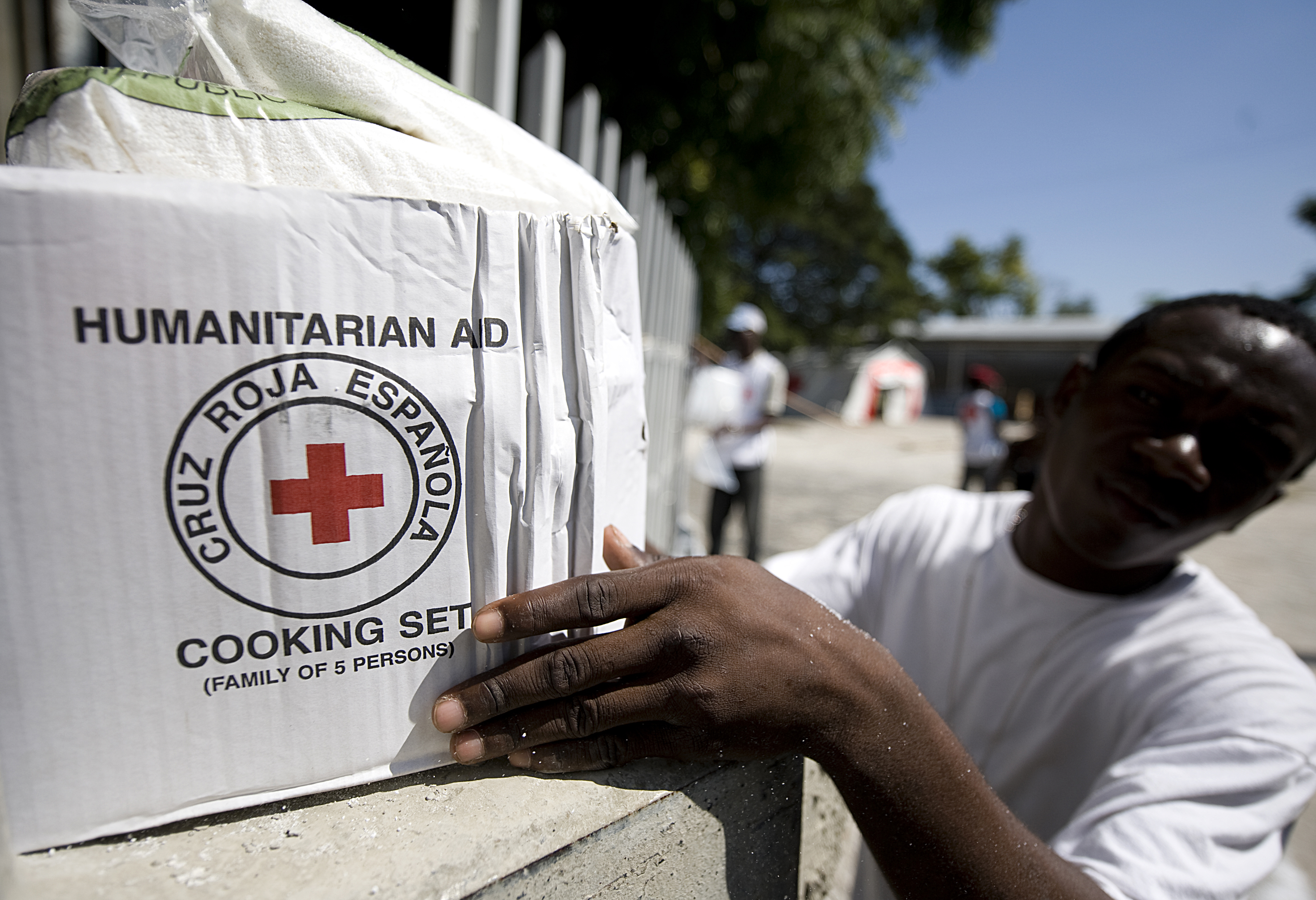
Humanitarian aid being distributed in Haiti

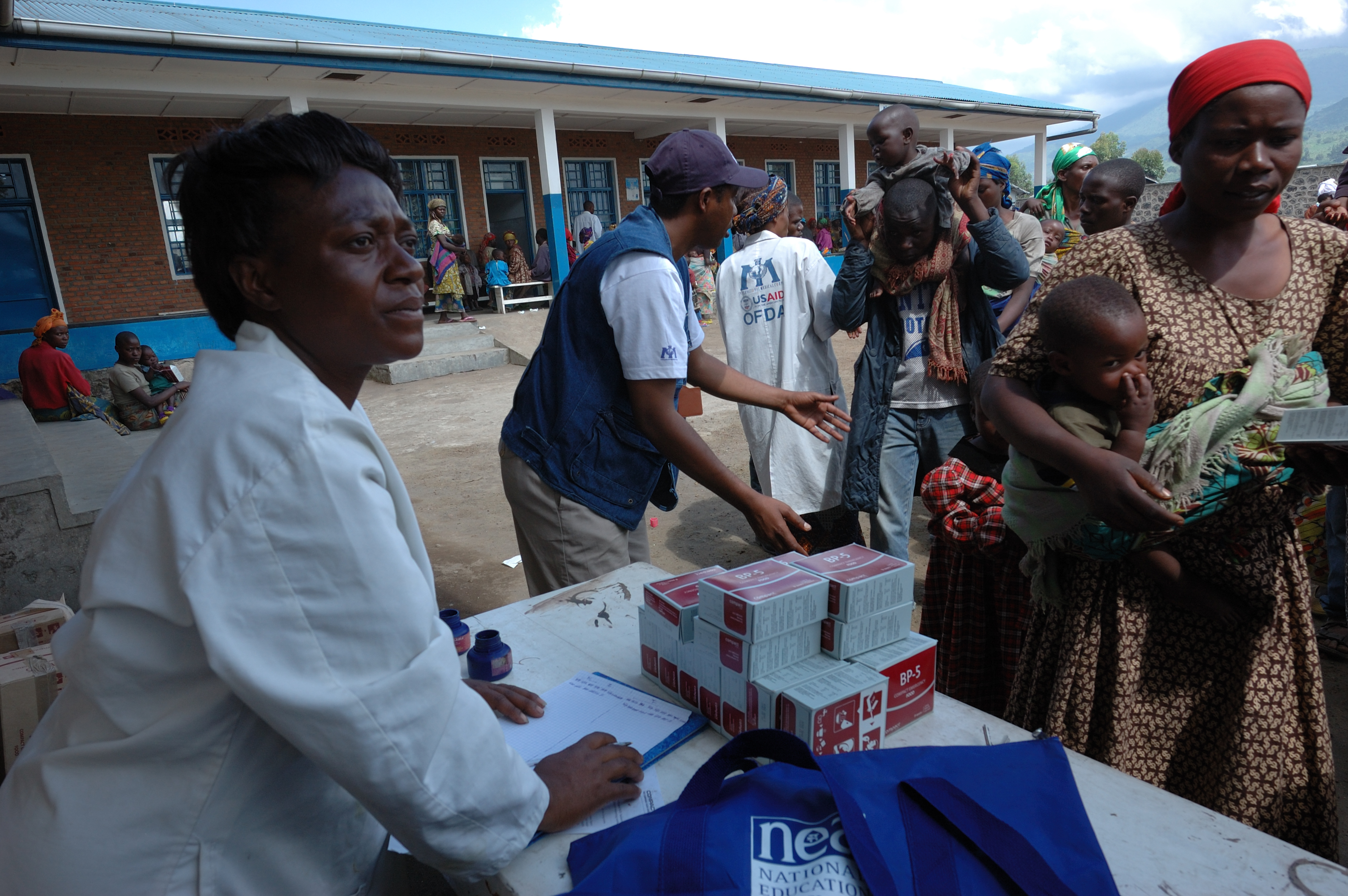
A UNICEF worker is distributing high-calorie food during an emergency situation in Goma, in the Democratic Republic of the Congo, in 2008.

Humanitarian aid is material and logistic assistance, usually in the short-term, to people in need. Among the people in need are the homeless, refugees, and victims of natural disasters, wars, and famines. The primary objective of humanitarian aid is to save lives, alleviate suffering, and maintain human dignity.

While often used interchangeably, humanitarian aid and humanitarian assistance are distinct concepts. Humanitarian aid generally refers to the provision of immediate, short-term relief in crisis situations, such as food, water, shelter, and medical care. Humanitarian assistance, on the other hand, encompasses a broader range of activities, including longer-term support for recovery, rehabilitation, and capacity building. Humanitarian aid is distinct from development aid, which seeks to address underlying socioeconomic factors.

Humanitarian aid can come from either local or international communities through international non-governmental organizations (INGOs). In reaching out to international communities, the Office for the Coordination of Humanitarian Affairs (OCHA) of the United Nations (UN) is responsible for coordination responses to emergencies. It taps to the various members of Inter-Agency Standing Committee, whose members are responsible for providing emergency relief. The four UN entities that have primary roles in delivering humanitarian aid are United Nations Development Programme (UNDP), the United Nations Refugee Agency (UNHCR), the United Nations Children's Fund (UNICEF) and the World Food Programme (WFP).According to the Global Humanitarian Overview of OCHA, nearly 300 million people need humanitarian assistance and protection in 2024, or 1 out of 27 people worldwide. In 2024, the estimated global humanitarian response requirements amount to approximately US$46.4 billion, targeting around 188 million of the most vulnerable people in 69 countries. The three major drivers of humanitarian needs worldwide are conflicts, climate-related disasters, and economic factors.

== Types ==
=== Food aid ===
Food aid received

Food aid is a type of aid whereby food is provided to people in need of it, including during or after an armed conflict or disaster. Food aid can be provided by importing food, buying food locally, or distributing cash or vouchers. The world's largest provider of food aid is the World Food Programme.

The welfare impacts of any food aid-induced changes in food prices are decidedly mixed, underscoring the reality that it is impossible to generate only positive intended effects from an international aid program. Although food aid constitutes a significant part of humanitarian assistance, evidence also suggests that it can initiate or amplify violent conflicts in the recipient countries.

=== Medical humanitarian aid ===
Global medical aid by cause (2017, OWID)

There are different kinds of medical humanitarian aid, including: providing medical supplies and equipment; sending professionals to an affected region; and long-term training for local medical staff. Such aid emerged when international organizations stepped in to respond to the need of national governments for global support and partnership to address natural disasters, wars, and other crises that impact people's health. Often, a humanitarian aid organization would clash with a government's approach to the unfolding domestic conflict. In such cases, humanitarian aid organizations have sought out autonomy to extend help regardless of political or ethnic affiliation.

Humanitarian medical aid assumes a biomedical approach which does not always account for the alternative beliefs and practices about health and well-being in the affected regions. This problem is rarely explored as most studies conducted are done from the lens of the donor or Westernized humanitarian organization rather than the recipient country's perspective. Discovering ways of encouraging locals to embrace bio-medicinal approaches while simultaneously respecting a given people's culture and beliefs remains a major challenge for humanitarian aid organizations; in particular as organizations constantly enter new regions as crises occur. However, understanding how to provide aid cohesively with existing regional approaches is necessary in securing the local peoples' acceptance of the humanitarian aid's work.

== Humanitarian funding ==
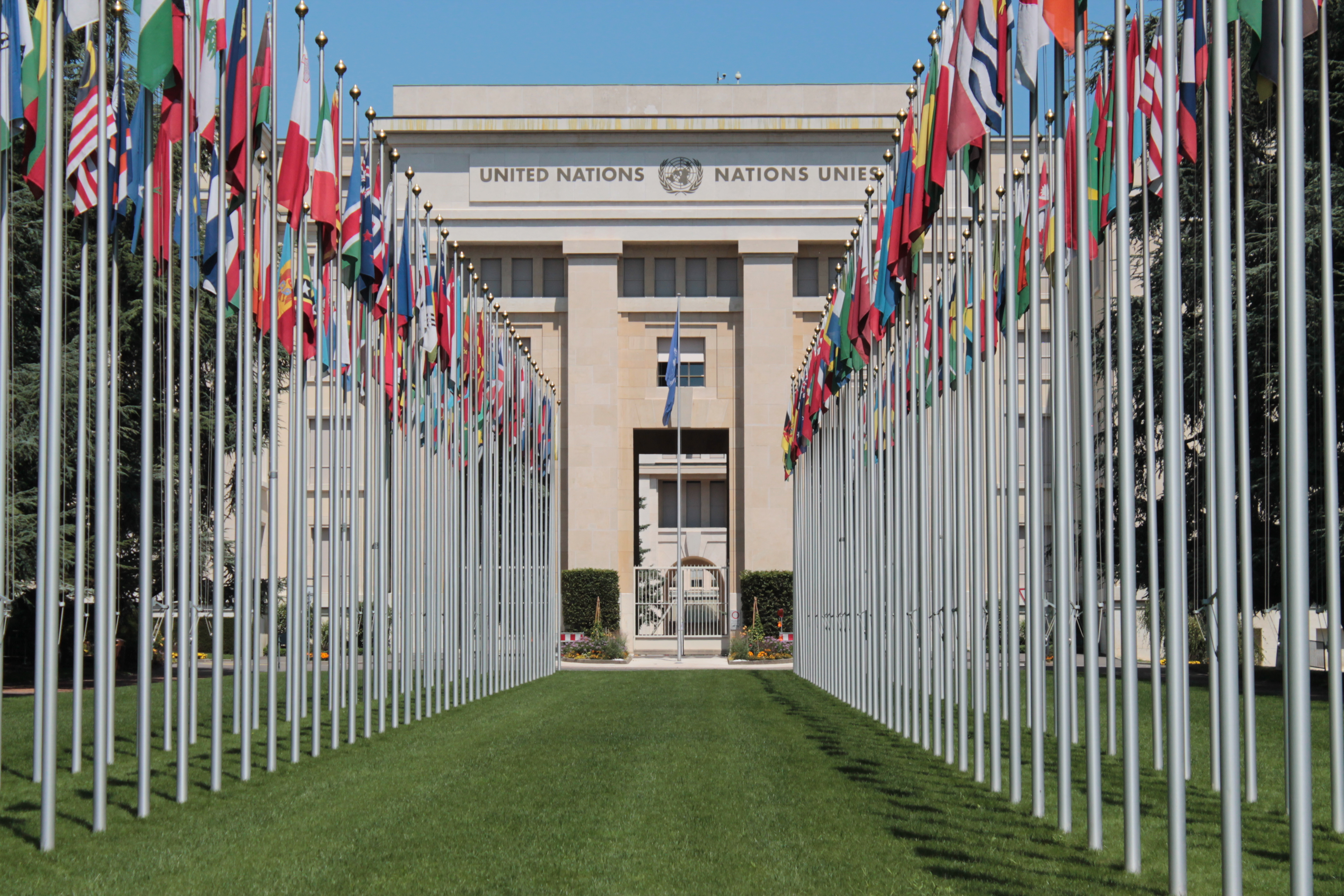
United Nations

Traditionally, 80% of humanitarian funding has come from institutional donors, while around 20% has come from private donors like foundations, individuals, and corporations. Yet, these contributions only represent 12-18% of Official Development Assistance. Humanitarian funding progressively increased in the 21st century, reaching a global all-time high of around $43.3 billion in 2022, before falling to the previous decade levels in 2025.

Humanitarian financing is used in multiple crises. Generally, between 50% and 70% is used in projects aligned with Humanitarian Response Plans and Humanitarian Needs Overviews coordinated by OCHA. Not all crises are equally funded, and in most cases humanitarian needs are not sufficiently covered by available financing.

Humanitarian funds are usually channelled through humanitarian organizations and help cover direct and indirect costs. Between 80% and 90% of humanitarian funding is earmarked for predefined projects. In 2024, 59% of all direct humanitarian financing went to a UN Agency, 7% to Red Cross and Red Crescent organizations, 21% to international NGOs, and only 2% to local or national NGOs. In turn, UN Agencies and international NGOs may channel financial resources through local NGOs that receive the funding indirectly as implementing partners. Only 9.5% of humanitarian funding goes directly or indirectly to local and national actors.

Part of emergency response funding goes to pooled funds managed by OCHA. These include the Central Emergency Response Fund, created in 2005, and Country-Based Pooled Funds.

== Delivery of humanitarian aid ==
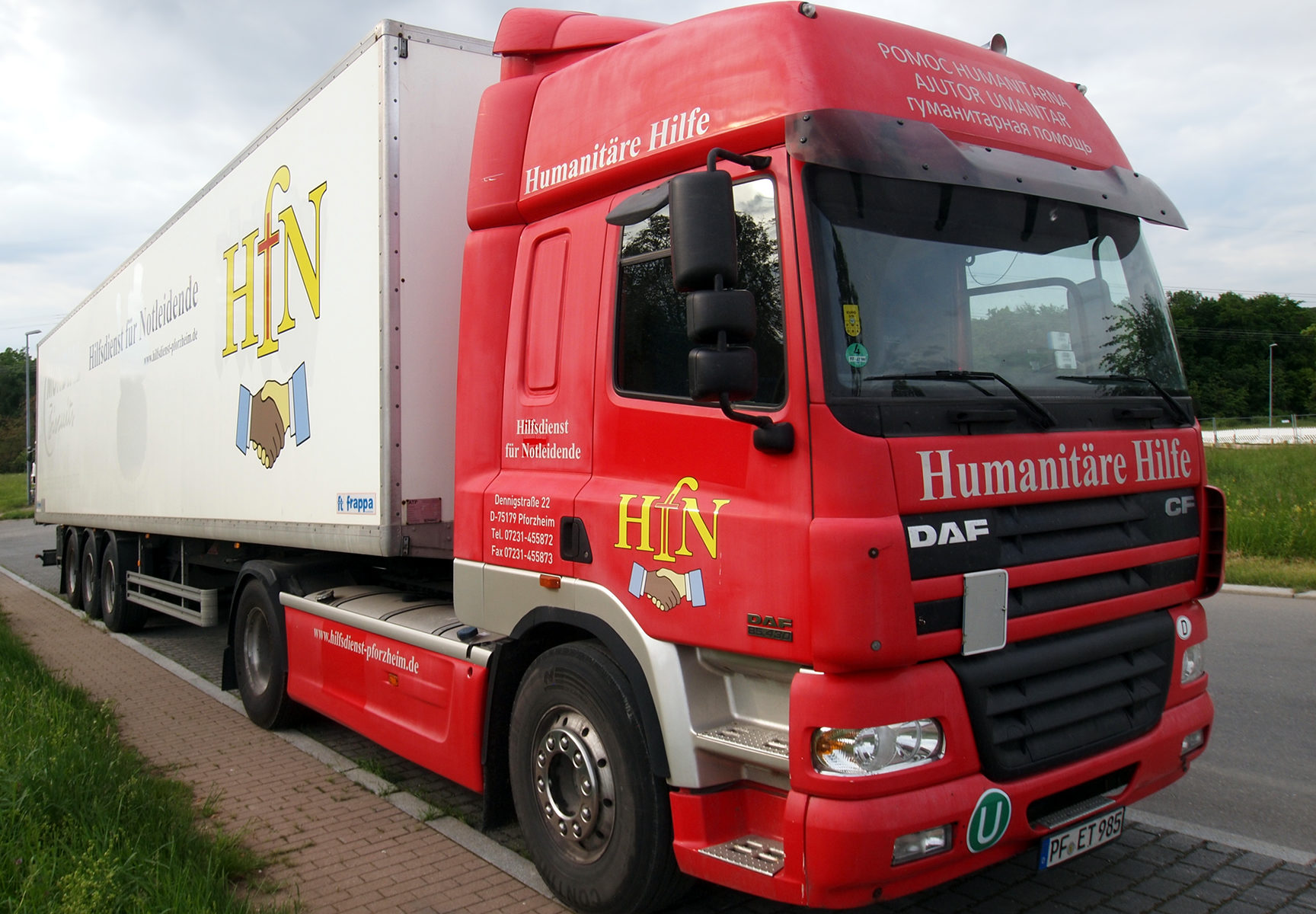
Truck for delivery of aid from Western to Eastern Europe

=== Methods of delivery ===
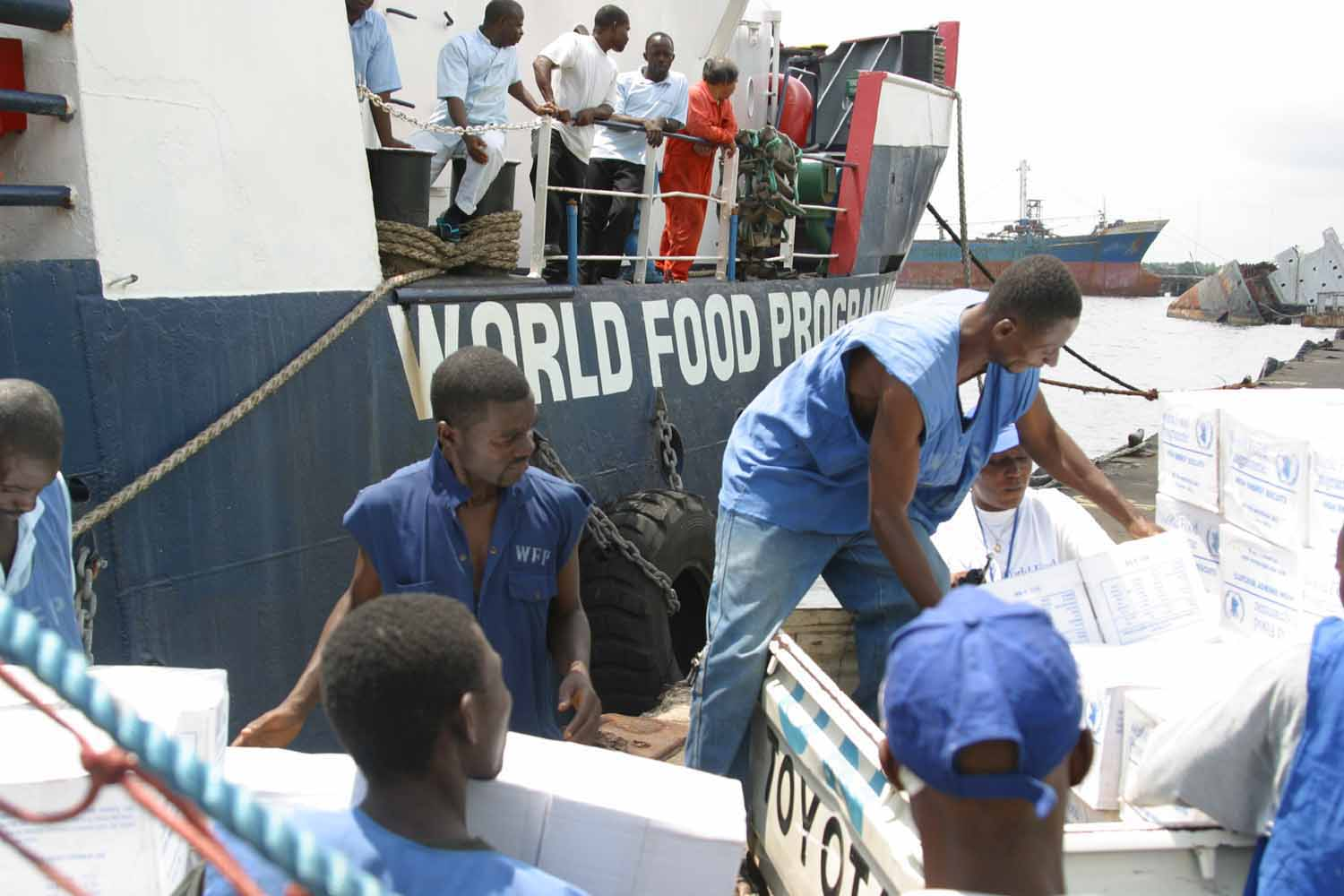
World Food Programme distributing food in Liberia

Humanitarian aid spans a wide range of activities, including providing food aid, shelter, education, healthcare or protection. The majority of aid is provided in the form of in-kind goods or assistance, although cash and vouchers constituted 21% of total humanitarian spending in 2025. Evidence has shown how cash transfers can be better for recipients as it gives them choice and control, they can be more cost-efficient and better for local markets and economies.

Humanitarian aid is not only delivered through aid workers sent by bilateral, multilateral or intergovernmental organizations, such as the United Nations. Actors like the affected people themselves, civil society, local informal first-responders, civil society, the diaspora, businesses, local governments, military, local and international non-governmental organizations all play a crucial role in a timely delivery of humanitarian aid.

How aid is delivered can affect the quality and quantity of aid. Often in disaster situations, international aid agencies work in hand with local agencies. There can be different arrangements on the role these agencies play, and such arrangement affects the quality of hard and soft aid delivered.

=== Humanitarian access ===
Securing access to humanitarian aid in post-disasters, conflicts, and complex emergencies is a major concern for humanitarian actors. To win assent for interventions, aid agencies often espouse the principles of humanitarian impartiality and neutrality. However, gaining secure access often involves negotiation and the practice of humanitarian diplomacy. In the arena of negotiations, humanitarian diplomacy is ostensibly used by humanitarian actors to try to persuade decision makers and leaders to act, at all times and in all circumstances, in the interest of vulnerable people and with full respect for fundamental humanitarian principles. However, humanitarian diplomacy is also used by state actors as part of their foreign policy.

=== United Nations' response ===
Multiple UN entities have roles in the delivery of humanitarian aid. In a large-scale emergency, the United Nations Office for the Coordination of Humanitarian Affairs (OCHA) orchestrates the actions of UN and other international organizations, and OCHA’s Humanitarian Cluster System assigns coordinating agencies to oversee work in specific thematic “clusters” such as shelter and health.

The United Nations Development Programme (UNDP) is responsible for operational activities in natural disaster mitigation, prevention and preparedness. The United Nations Refugee Agency (UNHCR) and United Nations Relief and Works Agency for Palestine Refugees in the Near East (UNRWA) protect and assist refugees. The United Nations Children's Fund (UNICEF) delivers aid to children and urges governments and warring parties to protect them. The United Nations Population Fund (UNFPA) provides emergency services and supplies with a focus on upholding the sexual and reproductive health and rights of women, girls and young people. The World Food Programme (WFP) delivers food and cash assistance to people left displaced, homeless or deprived of basic resources by conflict, climate-related disasters, pandemics or other catastrophic events. The Food and Agriculture Organization of the United Nations (FAO) is often called on to help farmers re-establish production following floods, outbreaks of livestock disease and similar emergencies. The World Health Organization (WHO) coordinates the international response to humanitarian health emergencies.

=== Use of technology and data ===
Since the 2010 Haiti Earthquake, the institutional and operational focus of humanitarian aid has been on leveraging technology to enhance humanitarian action, ensuring that more formal relationships are established, and improving the interaction between formal humanitarian organizations such as the United Nations (UN) Office for the Coordination of Humanitarian Affairs (OCHA) and informal volunteer and technological communities known as digital humanitarians.

The recent rise in Big Data, high-resolution satellite imagery and new platforms powered by advanced computing have already prompted the development of crisis mapping to help humanitarian organizations make sense of the vast volume and velocity of information generated during disasters. For example, crowdsourcing maps (such as OpenStreetMap) and social media messages in Twitter were used during the 2010 Haiti Earthquake and Hurricane Sandy to trace leads of missing people, infrastructure damages and raise new alerts for emergencies.

=== Gender and humanitarian aid ===
Even prior to a humanitarian crisis, gender differences exist. Women have limited access to paid work, are at risk of child marriage, and are more exposed to Gender based violence, such as rape and domestic abuse. Conflict and natural disasters exacerbate women's vulnerabilities. When delivering humanitarian aid, it is thus important for humanitarian actors, such as the United Nations, to include challenges specific to women in their humanitarian response. The Inter-Agency Standing Committee provides guidelines for humanitarian actors on how be inclusive of gender as a factor when delivering humanitarian aid. It recommends agencies to collect data disaggregated by sex and age to better understand which group of the population is in need of what type of aid. In recent years, the United Nations have been using sex and age disaggregated data more and more, consulting with gender specialists. In the assessment phase, several UN agencies meet to compile data and work on a humanitarian response plan. Throughout the plans. women specific challenges are listed and sex and age disaggregated data are used so when they deliver aid to a country facing a humanitarian crisis, girls and women can have access to the appropriate aid they need. Recent approaches to gender-responsive humanitarian action include peer learning programmes such as those developed by The Geneva Learning Foundation, which have been described in practitioner-led publications and independently evaluated within the context of CARE International's Gender in emergencies methodology.

== Problematic aspects ==
=== Distortions due to food aid ===
Some of the unintended effects of food aid include labor and production disincentives, changes in recipients' food consumption patterns and natural resources use patterns, distortion of social safety nets, distortion of NGO operational activities, price changes, and trade displacement. These issues arise from targeting inefficacy and poor timing of aid programs. Food aid can harm producers by driving down prices of local products, whereas the producers are not themselves beneficiaries of food aid. Unintentional harm occurs when food aid arrives or is purchased at the wrong time, when food aid distribution is not well-targeted to food-insecure households, and when the local market is relatively poorly integrated with broader national, regional and global markets.

Food aid can drive down local or national food prices in at least three ways.

1. First, monetization of food aid can flood the market, increasing supply. In order to be granted the right to monetize, operational agencies must demonstrate that the recipient country has adequate storage facilities and that the monetized commodity will not result in a substantial disincentive in either domestic agriculture or domestic marketing.
2. Second, households receiving aid may decrease demand for the commodity received or for locally produced substitutes or, if they produce substitutes or the commodity received, they may sell more of it. This can be most easily understood by dividing a population in a food aid recipient area into subpopulations based on two criteria: whether or not they receive food aid (recipients vs. non-recipients) and whether they are net sellers or net buyers of food. Because the price they receive for their output is lower, however, net sellers are unambiguously worse off if they do not receive food aid or some other form of compensatory transfer.
3. Finally, recipients may sell food aid to purchase other necessities or complements, driving down prices of the food aid commodity and its substitutes, but also increasing demand for complements. Most recipient economies are not robust and food aid inflows can cause large price decreases, decreasing producer profits, limiting producers' abilities to pay off debts and thereby diminishing both capacity and incentives to invest in improving agricultural productivity. However, food aid distributed directly or through FFW programs to households in northern Kenya during the lean season can foster increased purchase of agricultural inputs such as improved seeds, fertilizer and hired labor, thereby increasing agricultural productivity. Labor distortion can arise when Food-For-Work (FFW) Programs are more attractive than work on recipients' own farms/businesses, either because the FFW pays immediately, or because the household considers the payoffs to the FFW project to be higher than the returns to labor on its own plots. Food aid programs hence take productive inputs away from local private production, creating a distortion due to substitution effects, rather than income effects.

Beyond labor disincentive effects, food aid can have the unintended consequence of discouraging household-level production. Poor timing of aid and FFW wages that are above market rates cause negative dependency by diverting labor from local private uses, particularly if FFW obligations decrease labor on a household's own enterprises during a critical part of the production cycle. This type of disincentive impacts not only food aid recipients but also producers who sell to areas receiving food aid flows.

FFW programs are often used to counter a perceived dependency syndrome associated with freely distributed food. However, poorly designed FFW programs may cause more risk of harming local production than the benefits of free food distribution. In structurally weak economies, FFW program design is not as simple as determining the appropriate wage rate. Empirical evidence from rural Ethiopia shows that higher-income households had excess labor and thus lower (not higher as expected) value of time, and therefore allocated this labor to FFW schemes in which poorer households could not afford to participate due to labor scarcity. Similarly, FFW programs in Cambodia have shown to be an additional, not alternative, source of employment and that the very poor rarely participate due to labor constraints.

Food aid was found to increase the human population by decreasing mortality.

==== Changed consumption patterns ====
Food aid that is relatively inappropriate to local uses can distort consumption patterns. Food aid is usually exported from temperate climate zones and is often different than the staple crops grown in recipient countries, which usually have a tropical climate. The logic of food export inherently entails some effort to change consumers' preferences, to introduce recipients to new foods and thereby stimulate demand for foods with which recipients were previously unfamiliar or which otherwise represent only a small portion of their diet.

Massive shipments of wheat and rice into the West African Sahel during the food crises of the mid-1970s and mid-1980s were widely believed to stimulate a shift in consumer demand from indigenous coarse grains – millet and sorghum – to western crops such as wheat. During the 2000 drought in northern Kenya, the price of changaa (a locally distilled alcohol) fell significantly and consumption seems to have increased as a result. This was a result of grain food aid inflows increasing the availability of low-cost inputs to the informal distilling industry.

==== Natural resource overexploitation ====
Recent research suggests that patterns of food aid distribution may inadvertently affect the natural environment, by changing consumption patterns and by inducing locational change in grazing and other activities. A pair of studies in Northern Kenya found that food aid distribution seems to induce greater spatial concentration of livestock around distribution points, causing localized rangeland degradation. The food aid provided as whole grain also requires more cooking, and thus more fuelwood is consumed, stimulating local deforestation.

=== Increasing existing conflicts ===
In addition to post-conflict settings, a large portion of aid is often directed at countries currently undergoing conflicts. However, the effectiveness of humanitarian aid, particularly food aid, in conflict-prone regions has been criticized in recent years. There have been accounts of humanitarian aid being not only inefficacious but actually fuelling conflicts in the recipient countries. Aid stealing is one of the prime ways in which conflict is promoted by humanitarian aid. Aid can be seized by armed groups, and even if it does reach the intended recipients, "it is difficult to exclude local members of a local militia group from being direct recipients if they are also malnourished and qualify to receive aid."

Furthermore, analyzing the relationship between conflict and food aid, recent research shows that the United States food aid promoted civil conflict in recipient countries on average. An increase in United States' wheat aid increased the duration of armed civil conflicts in recipient countries, and ethnic polarization heightened this effect. However, since academic research on aid and conflict focuses on the role of aid in post-conflict settings, the aforementioned finding is difficult to contextualize. Nevertheless, research on Iraq shows that "small-scale [projects], local aid spending ... reduces conflict by creating incentives for average citizens to support the government in subtle ways." Similarly, another study also shows that aid flows can "reduce conflict because increasing aid revenues can relax government budget constraints, which can [in return] increase military spending and deter opposing groups from engaging in conflict." Thus, the impact of humanitarian aid on conflict may vary depending upon the type and mode in which aid is received, and, inter alia, the local socio-economic, cultural, historical, geographical and political conditions in the recipient countries.

==== Increasing conflict duration ====
International aid organizations identify theft by armed forces on the ground as a primary unintended consequence through which food aid and other types of humanitarian aid promote conflict. Food aid usually has to be transported across large geographic territories and during the transportation it becomes a target for armed forces, especially in countries where the ruling government has limited control outside of the capital. Accounts from Somalia in the early 1990s indicate that between 20 and 80 percent of all food aid was stolen, looted, or confiscated. In the former Yugoslavia, the UN Refugee Agency (UNHCR) lost up to 30 percent of the total value of aid to Serbian armed forces. On top of that 30 percent, bribes were given to Croatian forces to pass their roadblocks in order to reach Bosnia.

The value of the stolen or lost provisions can exceed the value of the food aid alone since convoy vehicles and telecommunication equipment are also stolen. MSF Holland, international aid organization operating in Chad and Darfur, underscored the strategic importance of these goods, stating that these "vehicles and communications equipment have a value beyond their monetary worth for armed actors, increasing their capacity to wage war"

A famous instance of humanitarian aid unintentionally helping rebel groups occurred during the Nigeria-Biafra civil war in the late 1960s, where the rebel leader Odumegwu Ojukwu only allowed aid to enter the region of Biafra if it was shipped on his planes. These shipments of humanitarian aid helped the rebel leader to circumvent the siege on Biafra placed by the Nigerian government. These stolen shipments of humanitarian aid caused the Biafran civil war to last years longer than it would have without the aid, claim experts.

The most well-known instances of aid being seized by local warlords in recent years come from Somalia, where food aid is funneled to al-Shabaab, a Somali militant group that controls much of Southern Somalia. Moreover, reports reveal that Somali contractors for aid agencies have formed a cartel and act as important power brokers, arming opposition groups with the profits made from the stolen aid"

Rwandan government appropriation of food aid in the early 1990s was so problematic that aid shipments were canceled multiple times. In Zimbabwe in 2003, Human Rights Watch documented examples of residents being forced to display ZANU-PF Party membership cards before being given government food aid. In eastern Zaire, leaders of the Hema ethnic group allowed the arrival of international aid organizations only upon agreement not give aid to the Lendu (opposition of Hema). Humanitarian aid workers have acknowledged the threat of stolen aid and have developed strategies for minimizing the amount of theft en route. However, aid can fuel conflict even if successfully delivered to the intended population as the recipient populations often include members of rebel groups or militia groups, or aid is "taxed" by such groups.

Academic research emphatically demonstrates that on average food aid promotes civil conflict. Namely, increase in US food aid leads to an increase in the incidence of armed civil conflict in the recipient country. Another correlation demonstrated is food aid prolonging existing conflicts, specifically among countries with a recent history of civil conflict. However, this does not find an effect on conflict in countries without a recent history of civil conflict. Moreover, different types of international aid other than food which is easily stolen during its delivery, namely technical assistance and cash transfers, can have different effects on civil conflict.

Community-driven development (CDD) programs have become one of the most popular tools for delivering development aid. In 2012, the World Bank supported 400 CDD programs in 94 countries, valued at US$30 billion. Academic research scrutinizes the effect of community-driven development programs on civil conflict. The Philippines' flagship development program KALAHI-CIDSS is concluded to have led to an increase in violent conflict in the country. After the program's initiation, some municipalities experienced a statistically significant large increase in casualties, as compared to other municipalities who were not part of the CDD. as a result, casualties suffered by government forces from insurgent-initiated attacks increased significantly.

These results are consistent with other examples of humanitarian aid exacerbating civil conflict. One explanation is that insurgents attempt to sabotage CDD programs for political reasons – successful implementation of a government-supported project could weaken the insurgents' position. Related findings of Beath, Christia, and Enikolopov further demonstrate that a successful community-driven development program increased support for the government in Afghanistan by exacerbating conflict in the short term, revealing an unintended consequence of the aid.

=== Waste and corruption in humanitarian aid ===
Waste and corruption are hard to quantify, in part because they are often taboo subjects, but they appear to be significant in humanitarian aid. For example, it has been estimated that over $8.75 billion was lost to waste, fraud, abuse and mismanagement in the Hurricane Katrina relief effort. Non-governmental organizations have in recent years made great efforts to increase participation, accountability and transparency in dealing with aid, yet humanitarian assistance remains a poorly understood process to those meant to be receiving it—much greater investment needs to be made into researching and investing in relevant and effective accountability systems.

However, there is no clear consensus on the trade-offs between speed and control, especially in emergency situations when the humanitarian imperative of saving lives and alleviating suffering may conflict with the time and resources required to minimise corruption risks. Researchers at the Overseas Development Institute have highlighted the need to tackle corruption with, but not limited to, the following methods:

1. Resist the pressure to spend aid rapidly.
2. Continue to invest in audit capacity, beyond simple paper trails;
3. Establish and verify the effectiveness of complaints mechanisms, paying close attention to local power structures, security and cultural factors hindering complaints;
4. Clearly explain the processes during the targeting and registration stages, highlighting points such as the fact that people should not make payments to be included, photocopy and read aloud any lists prepared by leaders or committees.

==== Competition and limited sustainability in medical aid ====
In the humanitarian medical aid sector, multiple organizations often exist to solve the same problem. Rather than collaborating to address a given situation, organizations frequently interact as competitors, which creates bottlenecks for treatment and supplies. A second limitation is how humanitarian medical organizations are focused on a specific disaster or epidemic, without a plan for whatever might come next. For example, international organizations frequently enter a region, provide short term aid, and then exit without ensuring local capacity to maintain or sustain this medical care.

=== Abuse of power by aid workers ===
Reports of sexual exploitation and abuse in humanitarian response have been reported following humanitarian interventions in Liberia, Guinea and Sierra Leone in 2002, in Central African Republic and in the Democratic Republic of the Congo.

A 2021 report on the Racial Equity Index indicated that just under two-thirds of aid workers had experienced racism, and 98% of survey respondents had witnessed it.

=== Contrary practice ===
Countries or war parties that prevent humanitarian relief are generally under unanimous criticism. Such was the case for the Derg regime, preventing relief to the population of Tigray in the 1980s, and the prevention of relief aid in the Tigray War of 2020–2021 by the Abiy Ahmed Ali regime of Ethiopia was again widely condemned.

== Aid workers ==
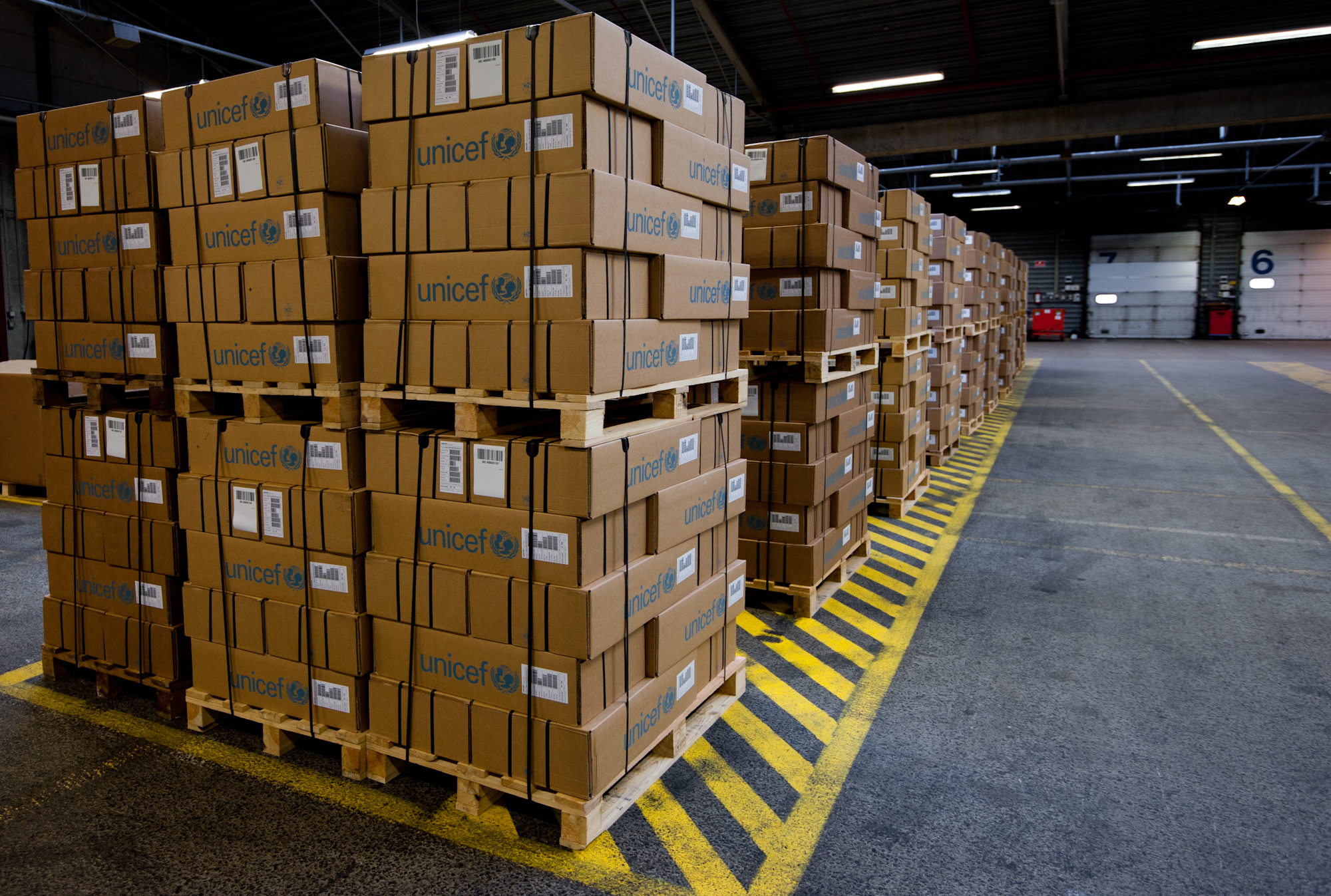
UNICEF humanitarian aid, ready for deploying

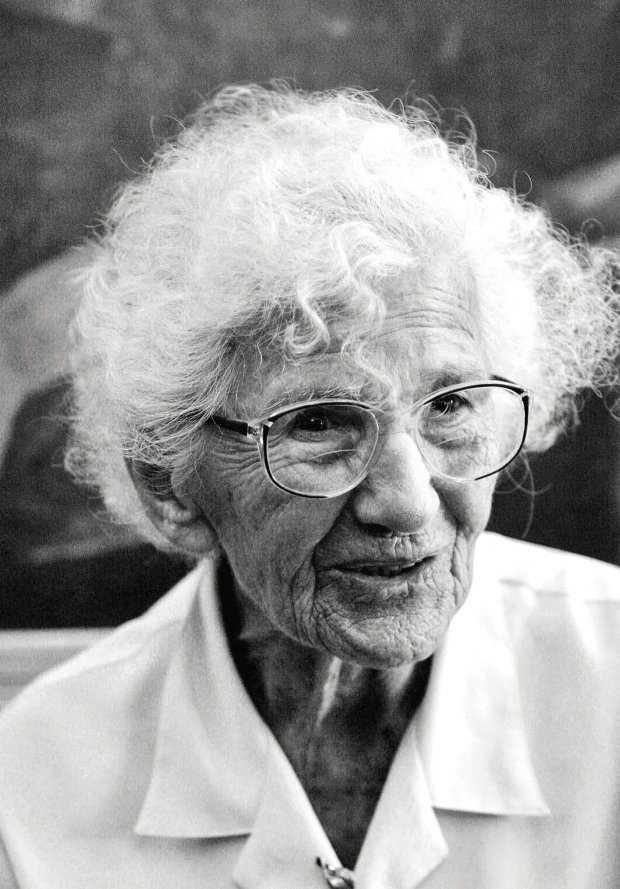
Wanda Błeńska, Polish leprosy expert and missionary who successfully developed the Buluba Hospital in Uganda

Aid workers are people who are distributed internationally to do humanitarian aid work.

=== Composition ===
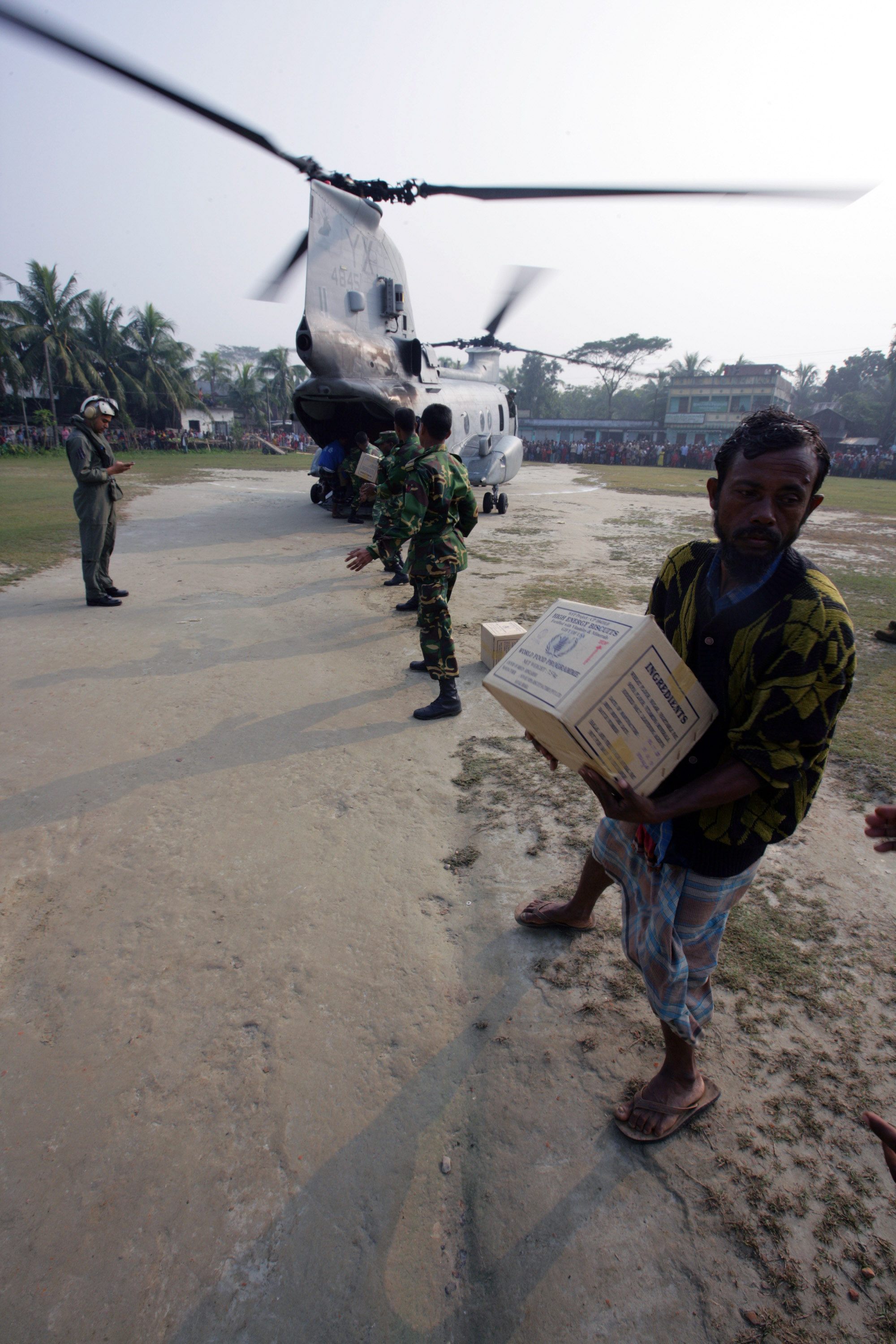
Bangladeshi citizens offload food rations from a US Marine CH-46E helicopter of 11th Marine Expeditionary Unit after Tropical Cyclone Sidr in 2007.

The total number of humanitarian aid workers around the world has been calculated by ALNAP, a network of agencies working in the Humanitarian System, as 210,800 in 2008. This is made up of roughly 50% from NGOs, 25% from the Red Cross/Red Crescent Movement and 25% from the UN system. In 2010, it was reported that the humanitarian fieldworker population increased by approximately 6% per year over the previous 10 years.

=== Psychological issues ===
Aid workers are exposed to tough conditions and have to be flexible, resilient, and responsible in an environment that humans are not psychologically supposed to deal with, in such severe conditions that trauma is common. In recent years, a number of concerns have been raised about the mental health of aid workers.

The most prevalent issue faced by humanitarian aid workers is post-traumatic stress disorder (PTSD). Adjustment to normal life again can be a problem, with feelings such as guilt being caused by the simple knowledge that international aid workers can leave a crisis zone, whilst nationals cannot.

A 2015 survey conducted by The Guardian, with aid workers of the Global Development Professionals Network, revealed that 79 percent experienced mental health issues.

=== Attacks ===
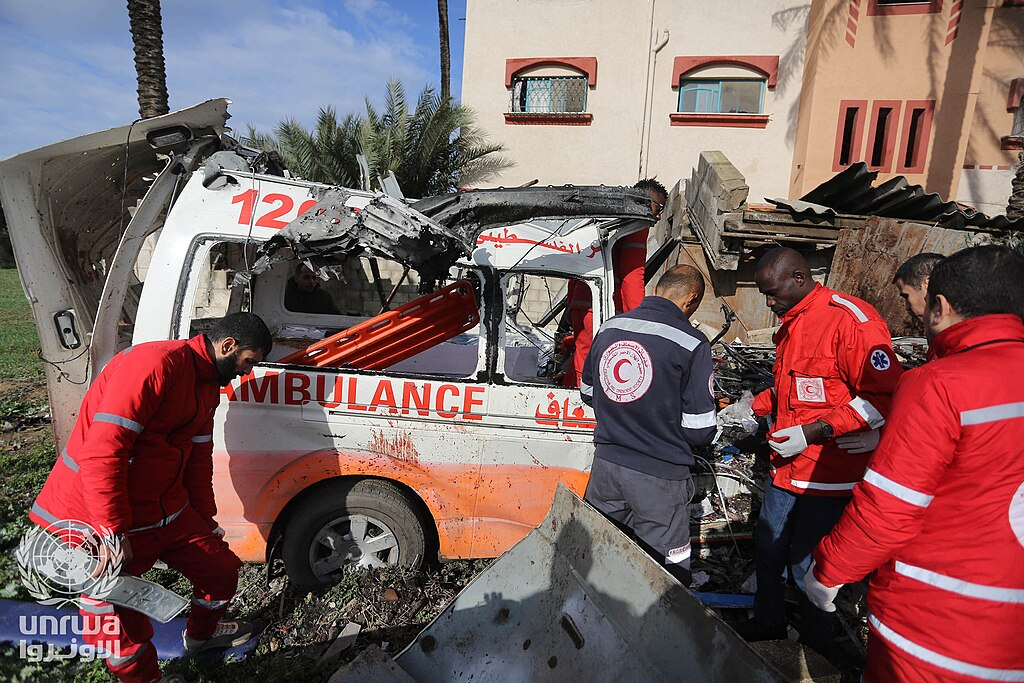
Red Crescent ambulance after Israeli airstrike (2023)

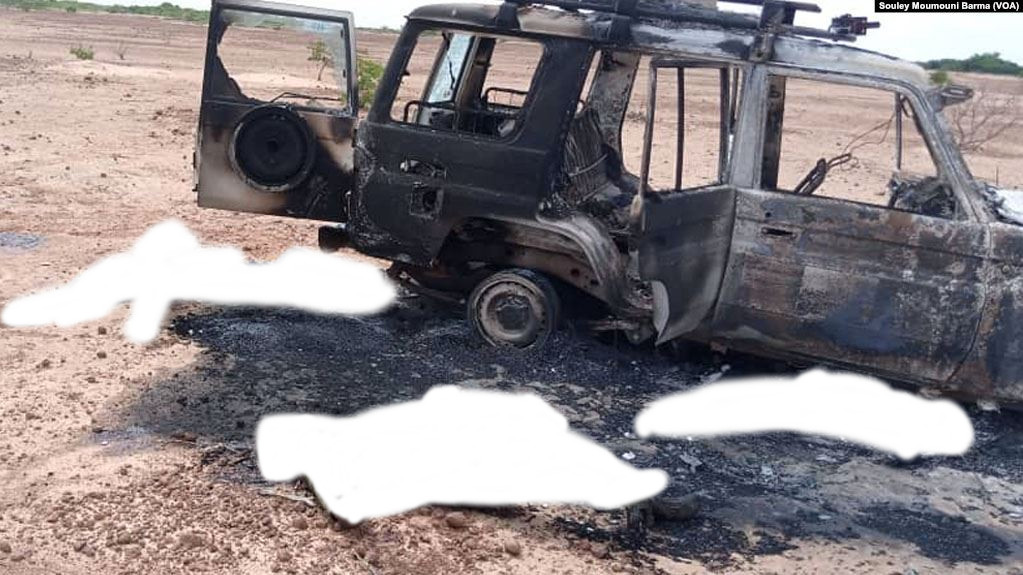
Shooting of French aid workers by Islamic State in Kouré, Niger (2020)

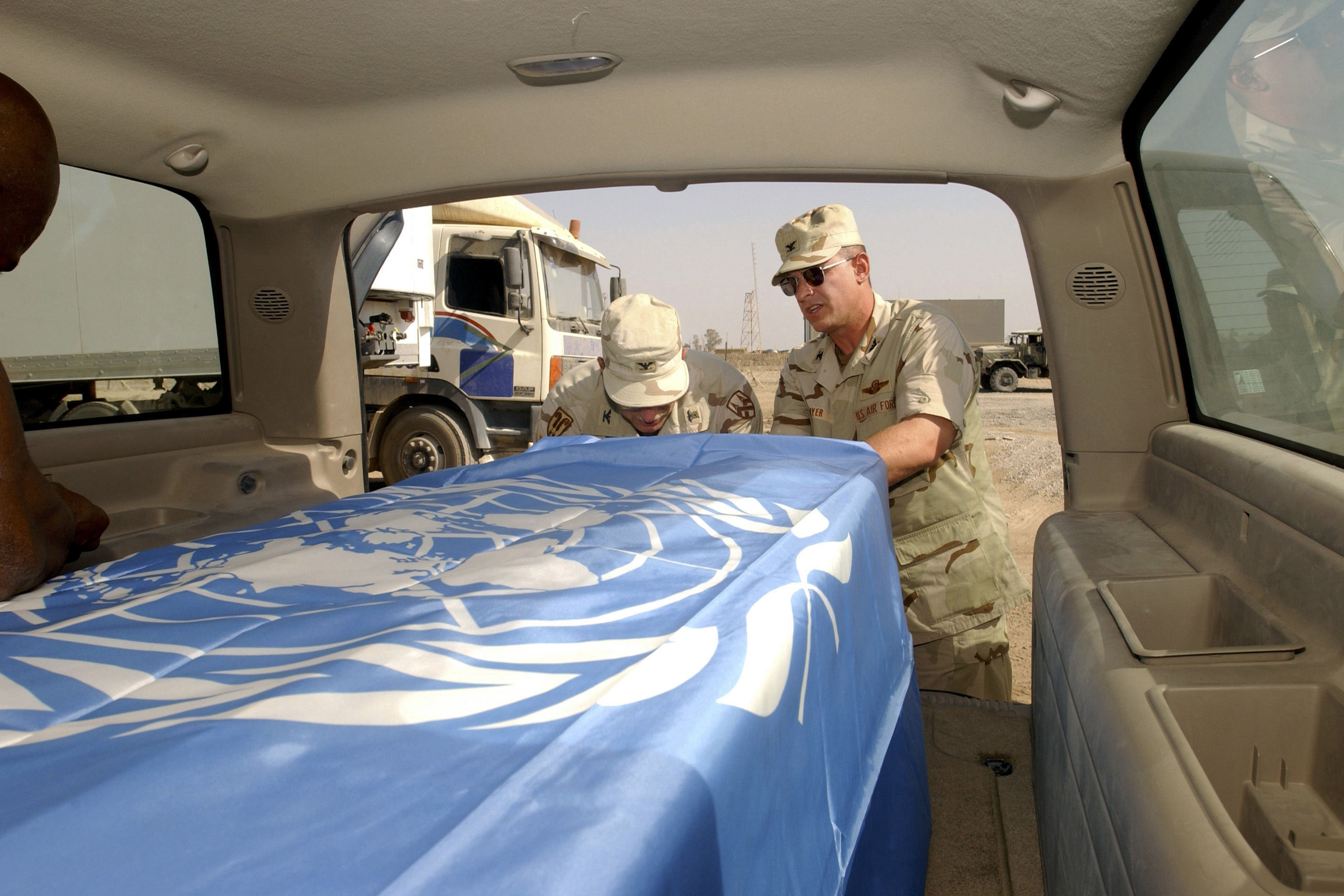
Casket of UN Chief Ambassador to Iraq (2003)

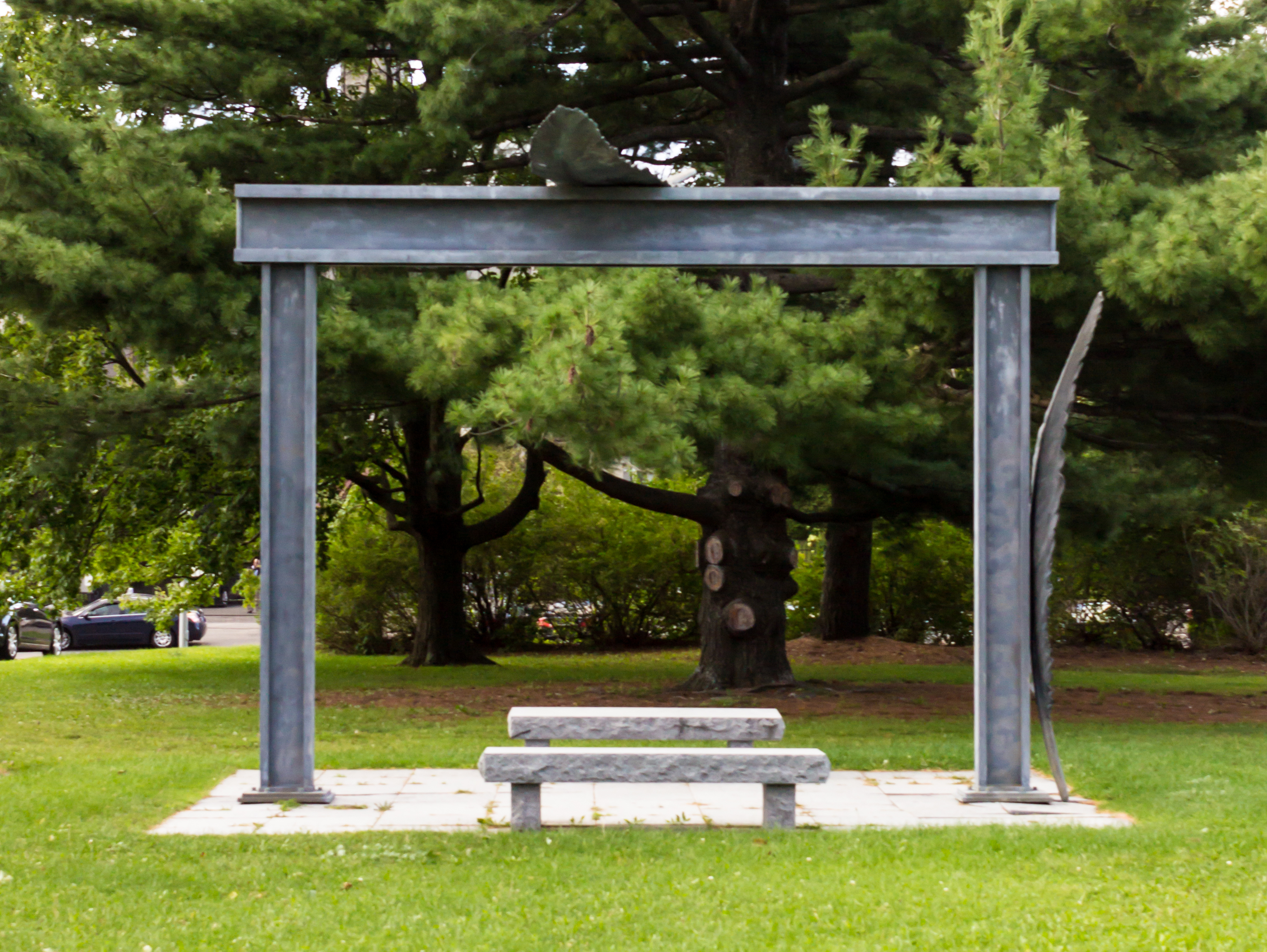
Monument to Canadian Aid Workers

Attacks on humanitarian workers are a leading cause of death among aid workers. Under international humanitarian law, deliberate violence is prohibited against protected persons, including humanitarian aid workers belonging to United Nations agencies, nongovernmental organisations (NGOs), and the International Red Cross and Red Crescent Movement. Attacks have become increasingly more frequent since 1997 when the Aid Worker Security Database (AWSD) began tracking them. This article contains a list of major attacks on humanitarian workers, primarily drawn from the AWSD. A full downloadable list, from 1997–present, can be found on their website.

The number of aid workers attacked has increased from 260 in 2008 to 595 in 2023. For the first 20 years of the AWSD, Afghanistan, South Sudan, Sudan, Somalia, and Syria were consistently the most dangerous places for aid workers to operate. Between 2013 and 2018, an average of 127 aid workers were killed, 120 injured, and 104 abducted worldwide per year. In November 2024, the UN reported that 281 aid workers had been killed that year, making 2024 the deadliest year on record until then; 175 of the deaths occurred in Gaza. Additionally the UN stated that 333 aid workers had been killed thus far in the Gaza war, the highest number recorded in a single crisis. In 2025, violence against aid workers has continued to increase, reaching a new record of nearly 1,200 victims in over 700 incidents, resulting in the killing of 350 aid workers. Far from being an artifact of the increase in volume and operations of humanitarian response, violence against aid workers has drastically increased at the same time as global humanitarian funding has decreased.

The most common causes of death among aid workers are shootings and air strikes, with road travel being particularly dangerous. A large contributor to violence against aid workers is kidnapping, though most end in release after negotiations. Motives for attacks on aid workers are often unknown, but of those that are known the cause is frequently political.

== Standards ==
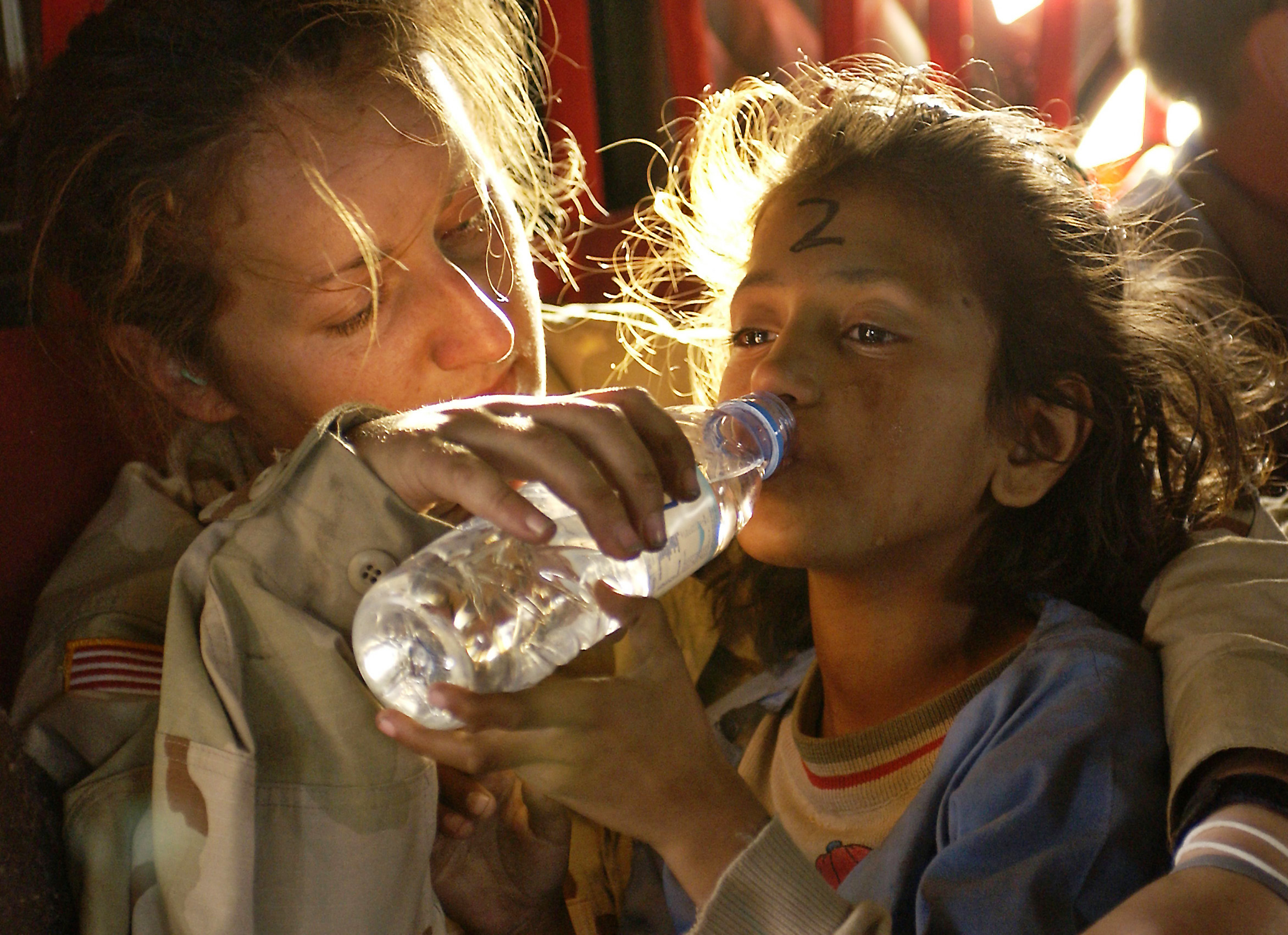
An American soldier gives a young Pakistani girl a drink of water as they are airlifted from Muzaffarabad to Islamabad following the 2005 Kashmir earthquake.

The humanitarian community has initiated a number of interagency initiatives to improve accountability, quality and performance in humanitarian action. Four of the most widely known initiatives are, ALNAP, the CHS Alliance, the Sphere Project and the Core Humanitarian Standard on Quality and Accountability (CHS). Representatives of these initiatives began meeting together on a regular basis in 2003 in order to share common issues and harmonise activities where possible.

=== Sphere Project ===
The Sphere Project handbook, Humanitarian Charter and Minimum Standards in Disaster Response, which was produced by a coalition of leading non-governmental humanitarian agencies, lists the following principles of humanitarian action:

- The right to life with dignity
- The distinction between combatant and non-combatants
- The principle of non-refoulement

=== Core Humanitarian Standard on Quality and Accountability ===
Logo of the Core Humanitarian Standard

Another humanitarian standard used is the Core Humanitarian Standard on Quality and Accountability (CHS). It was approved by the CHS Technical Advisory Group in 2014, and has since been endorsed by many humanitarian actors such as "the Boards of the Humanitarian Accountability Partnership (HAP), People in Aid and the Sphere Project". It comprises nine core standards, which are complemented by detailed guidelines and indicators.

While some critics were questioning whether the sector will truly benefit from the implementation of yet another humanitarian standard, others have praised it for its simplicity. Most notably, it has replaced the core standards of the Sphere Handbook and it is regularly referred to and supported by officials from the United Nations, the EU, various NGOs and institutes.

== History ==
=== Origins ===
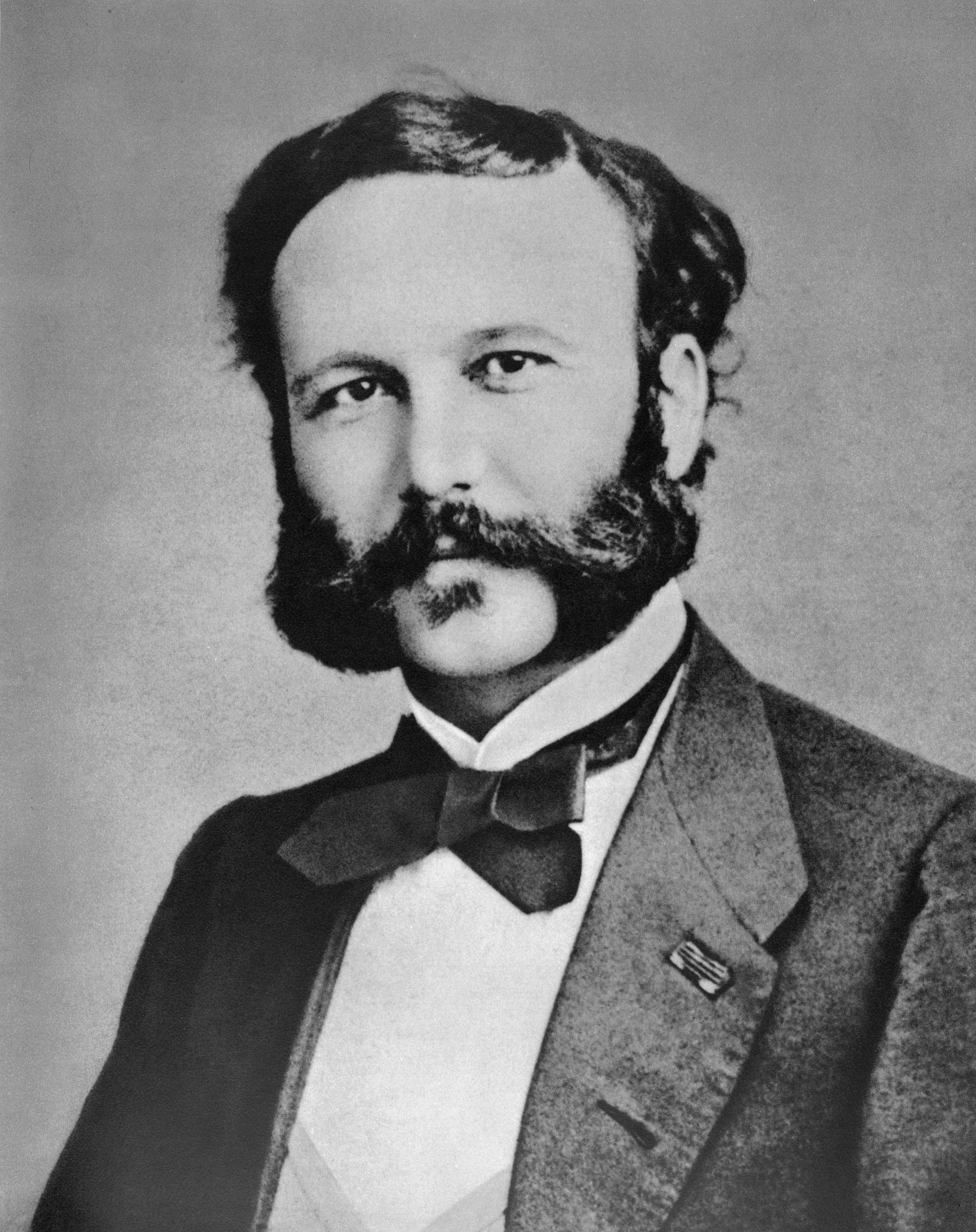
Henry Dunant

The beginnings of organized international humanitarian aid can be traced to the late 19th century. Early campaigns include British aid to distressed populations on the continent and in Sweden during the Napoleonic Wars, and the international relief campaigns during the Great Irish Famine in the 1840s.

In 1854, when the Crimean War began Florence Nightingale and her team of 38 nurses arrived to Barracks Hospital of Scutari where there were thousands of sick and wounded soldiers. Nightingale and her team watched as the understaffed military hospitals struggled to maintain hygienic conditions and meet the needs of patients. Ten times more soldiers were dying of disease than from battle wounds. Typhus, typhoid, cholera and dysentery were common in the army hospitals. Nightingale and her team established a kitchen, laundry and increased hygiene. More nurses arrived to aid in the efforts and the General Hospital at Scutari was able to care for 6,000 patients. Nightingale's contributions still influence humanitarian aid efforts. This is especially true in regard to Nightingale's use of statistics and measures of mortality and morbidity. Nightingale used principles of new science and statistics to measure progress and plan for her hospital. She kept records of the number and cause of deaths in order to continuously improve the conditions in hospitals. Her findings were that in every 1,000 soldiers, 600 were dying of communicable and infectious diseases. She worked to improve hygiene, nutrition and clean water and decreased the mortality rate from 60% to 42% to 2.2%. All of these improvements are pillars of modern humanitarian intervention. Once she returned to Great Britain she campaigned for the founding of the Royal Commission on the Health of the Army. She advocated for the use of statistics and coxcombs to portray the needs of those in conflict settings.

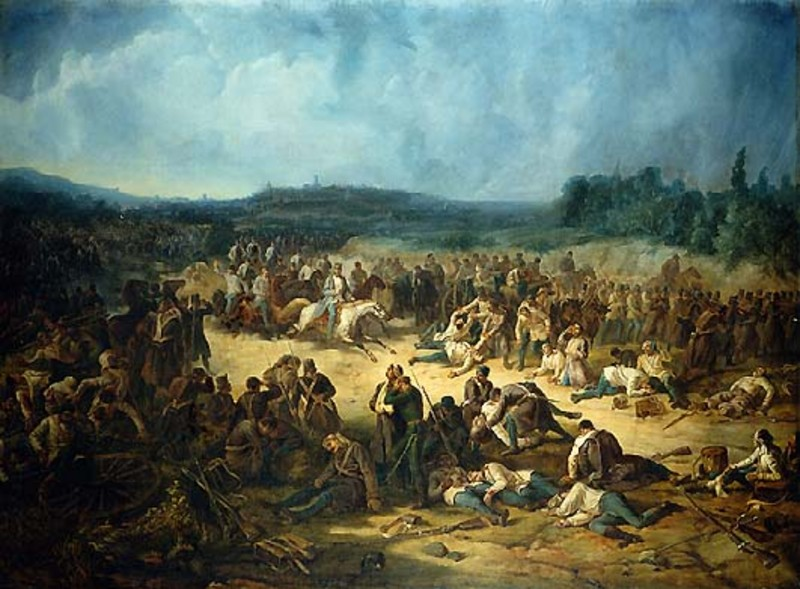
Henry Dunant at Solferino

The most well-known origin story of formalized humanitarian aid is that of Henri Dunant, a Swiss businessman and social activist, who upon seeing the sheer destruction and inhumane abandonment of wounded soldiers from the Battle of Solferino in June 1859, canceled his plans and began a relief response. Despite little to no experience as a medical physician, Dunant worked alongside local volunteers to assist the wounded soldiers from all warring parties, including Austrian, Italian and French casualties, in any way he could including the provision of food, water, and medical supplies. His graphic account of the immense suffering he witnessed, written in his book A Memory of Solferino, became a foundational text to modern humanitarianism.

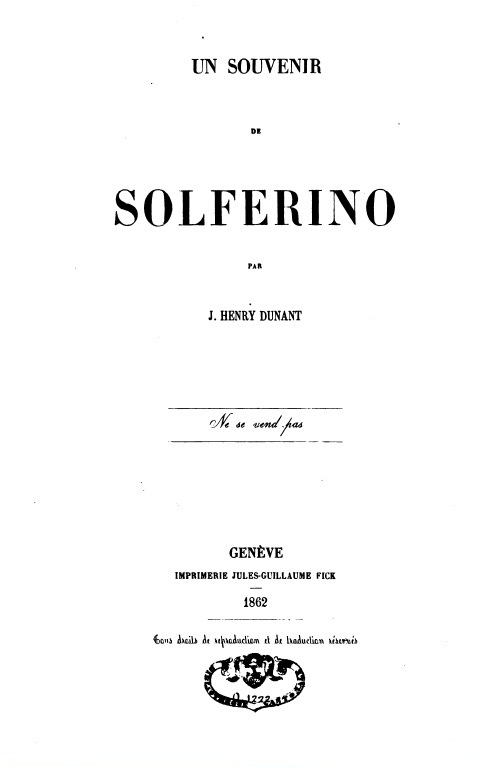
Cover of the original edition of A Memory of Solferino (1862)

A Memory of Solferino brought the battle and its suffering to its readers, equipping them to understand the state of war and treatment of soldiers after they were injured or killed. In his two-week experience attending to the wounded soldiers of all nationalities, Dunant established the conceptual pillars of what would later become the International Committee of the Red Cross and International Humanitarian Law: impartiality and neutrality. Dunant took these ideas and came up with two concepts that would alter the practice of war; first Dunant envisioned a creation of permanent volunteer relief societies, much like the ad hoc relief group he coordinated in Solferino, to assist wounded soldiers; next Dunant began an effort to call for the adoption of a treaty which would guarantee the protection of wounded soldiers and any who attempted to come to their aid.

After publishing his foundational text in 1862, progress came quickly for Dunant and his efforts to create a permanent relief society and International Humanitarian Law. The embryonic formation of the International Committee of the Red Cross had begun to take shape in 1863 when the private Geneva Society of Public Welfare created a permanent sub-committee called "The International Committee for Aid to Wounded in Situations of War". Composed of five Geneva citizens, this committee endorsed Dunant's vision to legally neutralize medical personnel responding to wounded soldiers. The constitutive conference of this committee in October 1863 created the statutory foundation of the International Committee of the Red Cross in their resolutions regarding national societies, caring for the wounded, their symbol, and most importantly the indispensable neutrality of ambulances, hospitals, medical personnel and the wounded themselves. Beyond this, in order to solidify humanitarian practice, the Geneva Society of Public Welfare hosted a convention between 8 and 22 August 1864 at the Geneva Town Hall with 16 diverse States present, including many governments of Europe, the Ottoman Empire, the United States of America (USA), Brazil and Mexico. This diplomatic conference was exceptional, not due to the number or status of its attendees but rather because of its very raison d'être. Unlike many diplomatic conferences before it, this conference's purpose was not to reach a settlement after a conflict nor to mediate between opposing interests; indeed this conference was to lay down rules for the future of conflict with aims to protect medical services and those wounded in battle.

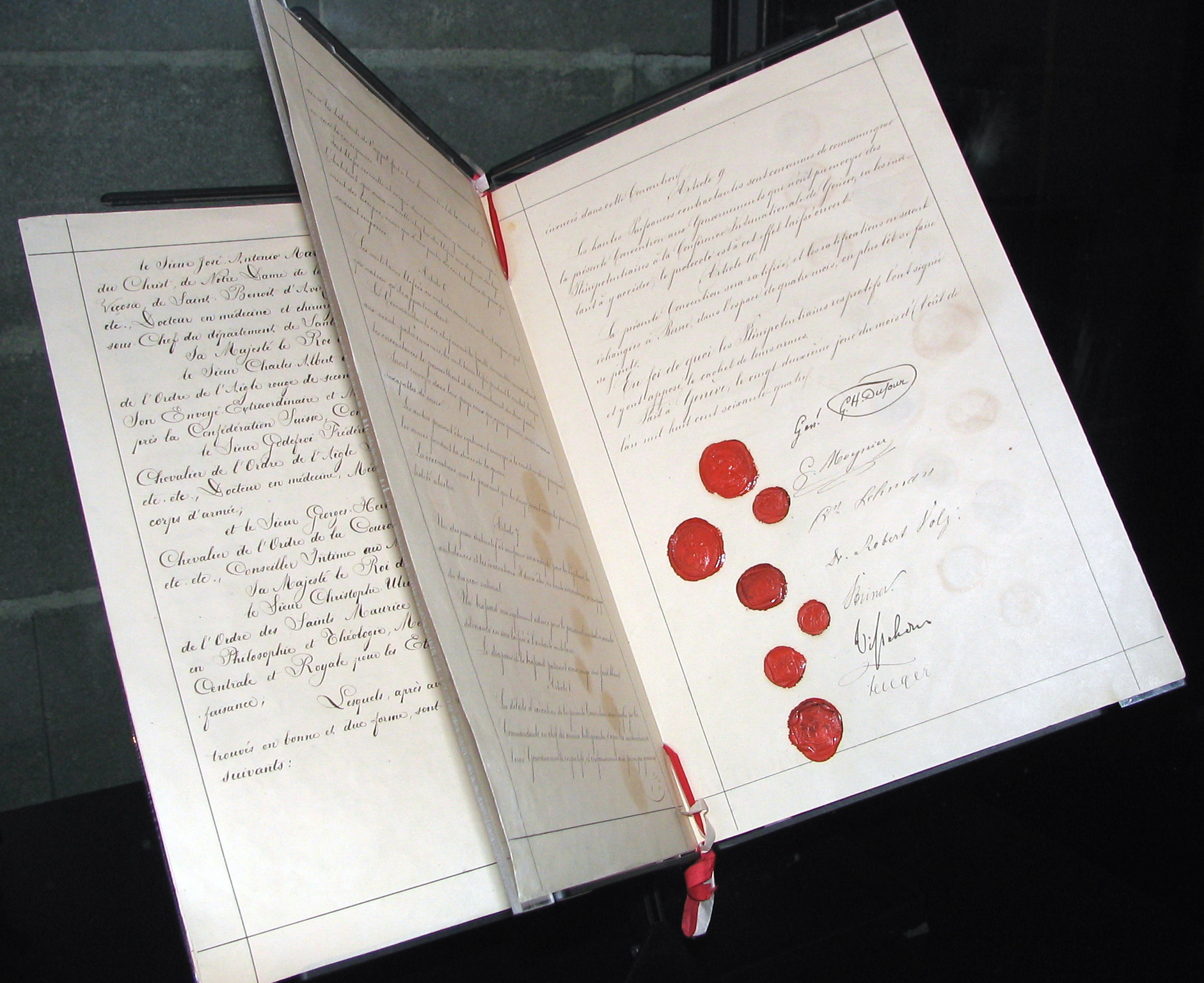
Original Geneva Conventions

The first of the renowned Geneva Conventions was signed on 22 August 1864; never before in history has a treaty so greatly impacted how warring parties engage with one another. The basic tenents of the convention outlined the neutrality of medical services, including hospitals, ambulances, and related personnel, the requirement to care for and protect the sick and wounded during the conflict and something of particular symbolic importance to the International Committee of the Red Cross: the Red Cross emblem. For the first time in contemporary history, it was acknowledged by a representative selection of states that war had limits. The significance only grew with time in the revision and adaptation of the Geneva Convention in 1906, 1929 and 1949; additionally, supplementary treaties granted protection to hospital ships, prisoners of war and most importantly to civilians in wartime.

The International Committee of the Red Cross exists to this day as the guardian of International Humanitarian Law and as one of the largest providers of humanitarian aid in the world.

=== Late 19th century ===
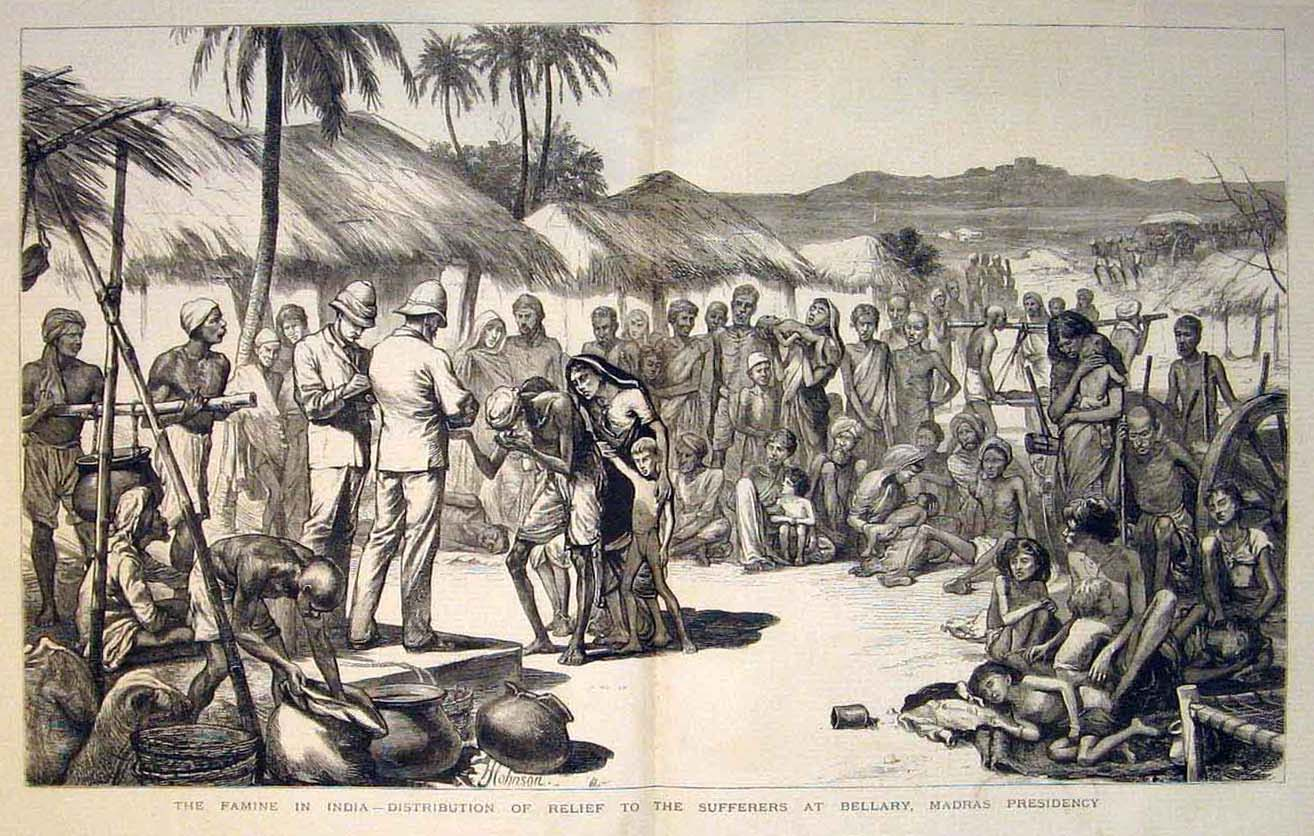
A contemporary print showing the distribution of relief in Bellary, Madras Presidency. From The Illustrated London News (1877).

Internationally organized humanitarian aid efforts continued to be launched for the rest of the century, often with ever-greater logistical acumen and experience. In 1876, after a drought led to cascading crop failures across Northern China, a famine broke out that lasted several years—during its course as many as 10 million people may have died from hunger and disease. British missionary Timothy Richard first called international attention to the famine in Shandong in the summer of 1876 and appealed to the foreign community in Shanghai for money to help the victims. The Shandong Famine Relief Committee was soon established, with those participating including diplomats, businessmen, as well as Christian missionaries, Catholic and Protestant alike. An international network was set up to solicit donations, ultimately bringing in 204,000 silver taels, the equivalent of $7–10 million if valued at 2012 silver prices.

Simultaneously in India, another campaign was launched in response to the Great Famine of 1876–78. Retrospectively, authorities from across the administrative and colonial structures of the British Raj and princely states have been to various degrees blamed for the shocking severity of the famine, with critiques revolving around their laissez-faire attitude and the resulting lack of any adequate policy to address the mass death and suffering across the subcontinent, though meaningful relief measures began to be introduced towards the famine's end. Privately, a famine relief fund was set up in the United Kingdom, raising £426,000 within its first few months of operation.

=== Early 20th century ===
Intertwined with and informed efforts related to the profound destruction and disruption caused by World War I, including that of the Red Cross and Red Crescent organization, the Russian famine of 1921–1922, taking place in a country already immensely burdened with systemic agriculture and logistical struggles—then ravaged by successive periods of industrial war, blockade, bad harvests, the Russian Revolution, its resulting political restructuring and social upheaval, and then the insurgency and war communism of the Russian Civil War that followed. In the nascent Russian Soviet Federative Socialist Republic, Vladimir Lenin allowed his personal friend and acclaimed thinker Maxim Gorky to pen an open letter to the international community asking for relief for the Russian people. Despite the ongoing ideological, material, and military conflicts levied by both the new socialist state and the capitalist international community towards one another, efforts to aid the starving population of Soviet Russia were intensive, deliberate, and effective. American efforts, led in large part future president Herbert Hoover, as well as those by the International Committee for Russian Relief joined extant humanitarian organizations in delivering food and medicine to Russia over the course of 1921 and 1922, at some points feeding over 10 millions Russians every day. With the United States left relatively untouched by World War I, its intensive private and public efforts in Russia constituted a clear expression of its new paramount soft power on the international stage, with power projection from European states having been either totally destroyed or severely limited in scope in the years following the conflict.

=== Post World War II and Cold War era 1940s–1960s ===
In the aftermath of World War II, Western nations led massive relief and reconstruction efforts. The Marshall Plan 1948–1951, a U.S. funded program to rebuild war torn European economies, came to be recognized as a "great humanitarian effort", institutionalizing foreign aid as a key policy. At the same time, Western Allies undertook operations like the Berlin Airlift 1948–1949 to supply 2.5 million blockaded residents of West Berlin with food and fuel, this unprecedented airlift delivered over 2.3 million tons of supplies and is often cited as one of the largest humanitarian aid missions in history. In the 1950s, Western countries also responded to refugee crises in Soviet bloc states. After the 1956 Hungarian Revolution, some 200,000 Hungarians fled to Austria and Yugoslavia, Western governments and militaries provided relief supplies and resettlement for tens of thousands. A U.S. European Command airlift Operation Safe Haven flew in hundreds of tons of Red Cross aid and eventually transported about 30,000 Hungarian refugees for resettlement in the United States. Western Europe, Canada, and other nations similarly opened their doors to the Hungarian refugees, an experience that helped shape modern refugee assistance mechanisms.

=== 1980s ===
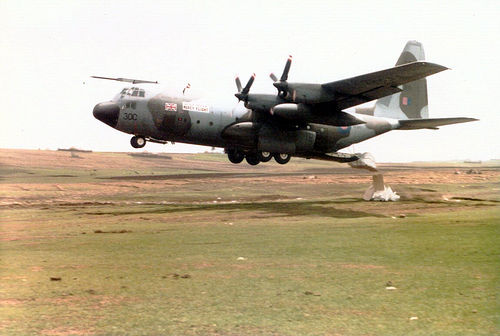
RAF C-130 airdropping food during 1985 famine

Early attempts were in private hands and were limited in their financial and organizational capabilities. It was only in the 1980s, that global news coverage and celebrity endorsement were mobilized to galvanize large-scale government-led famine (and other forms of) relief in response to disasters around the world. The 1983–85 famine in Ethiopia caused upwards of 1 million deaths and was documented by a BBC news crew, with Michael Buerk describing "a biblical famine in the 20th Century" and "the closest thing to hell on Earth".

Live Aid, a 1985 fund-raising effort headed by Bob Geldof induced millions of people in the West to donate money and to urge their governments to participate in the relief effort in Ethiopia. Some of the proceeds also went to the famine hit areas of Eritrea.

=== 1990s ===
In the nineties, the end of the Cold War era opened up a new area for the expansion and professionalisation of the humanitarian system. As the nature of conflicts and the dynamics of humanitarian emergencies changed, the United Nations published the Resolution 46/182. It set out responsibilities of states in responding to humanitarian crises, and set the basis for a global humanitarian system led by the United Nations.

In 1994, the Rwandan genocide and the major humanitarian crisis that followed exposed the weakness of the incipient humanitarian system, that was not ready to respond to complex emergencies in which big forced population displacements overlap with violence addressed toward civil society. This crisis, and the evaluation of its response, however, prompted a number of relevant changes like the expansion in the adoption of the Code of Conduct for the International Red Cross and Red Crescent Movement and Non-Governmental Organisations (NGOs) in Disaster Relief, the launch of the Sphere Project, the birth of multiple organizations such as ALNAP and People in Aid, and the transformation of the UN Department of Humanitarian Affairs into the current United Nations OCHA. IN 1999, MSF was awarded the Nobel Peace Prize.

=== 2000s ===
The beginning of the 21st century was marked by the "War on Terror" and the security agenda that were triggered by the September 11 attacks. Humanitarian action, considered as an strategic tool to address the root causes of conflict, became highly politized and instrumentalized, which in turn increased the risk of attacks against aid workers, like the one that in August 2003 targeted the United Nations in Baghdad.

Two enormous humanitarian crises at that time exposed the weaknesses of the humanitarian system: the civil conflict and genocide in Darfur and the 2004 Indian Ocean tsunami. Jan Egeland, recently appointed Emergency Relief Coordinator launched a review of the humanitarian response in those crises that, after being published in February 2005, led to the 2005 humanitarian reform. This initiative included the creation of the Humanitarian Cluster System, designed to improve coordination between humanitarian agencies working on the same issues, the overhaul of the Central Emergency Response Fund (CERF), and a proposal for a stronger humanitarian coordination structure built around the UN. The reform was also criticized for not being inclusive enough of NGOs and other humanitarian actors, and also left important leadership and accountability aspects unresolved.

=== 2010s ===
The beginning of the following decade was marked by three overlaping humanitarian crises that, once again, exposed the weaknesses of the humanitarian system. Although the initial response to the 2010 Haiti earthquake was generally considered adequate, it was followed by a cholera outbreak almost at the same time the 2010 Pakistan floods demanded attention from all humanitarian actors. The UN and the IASC responded proposing the 2011 Transformative agenda. This proposal included a number of protocols related to the large-scale activation of the humanitarian system, its coordination, and the humanitarian programme cycle, among others, while international and national NGOs complained, once again, for being left out.

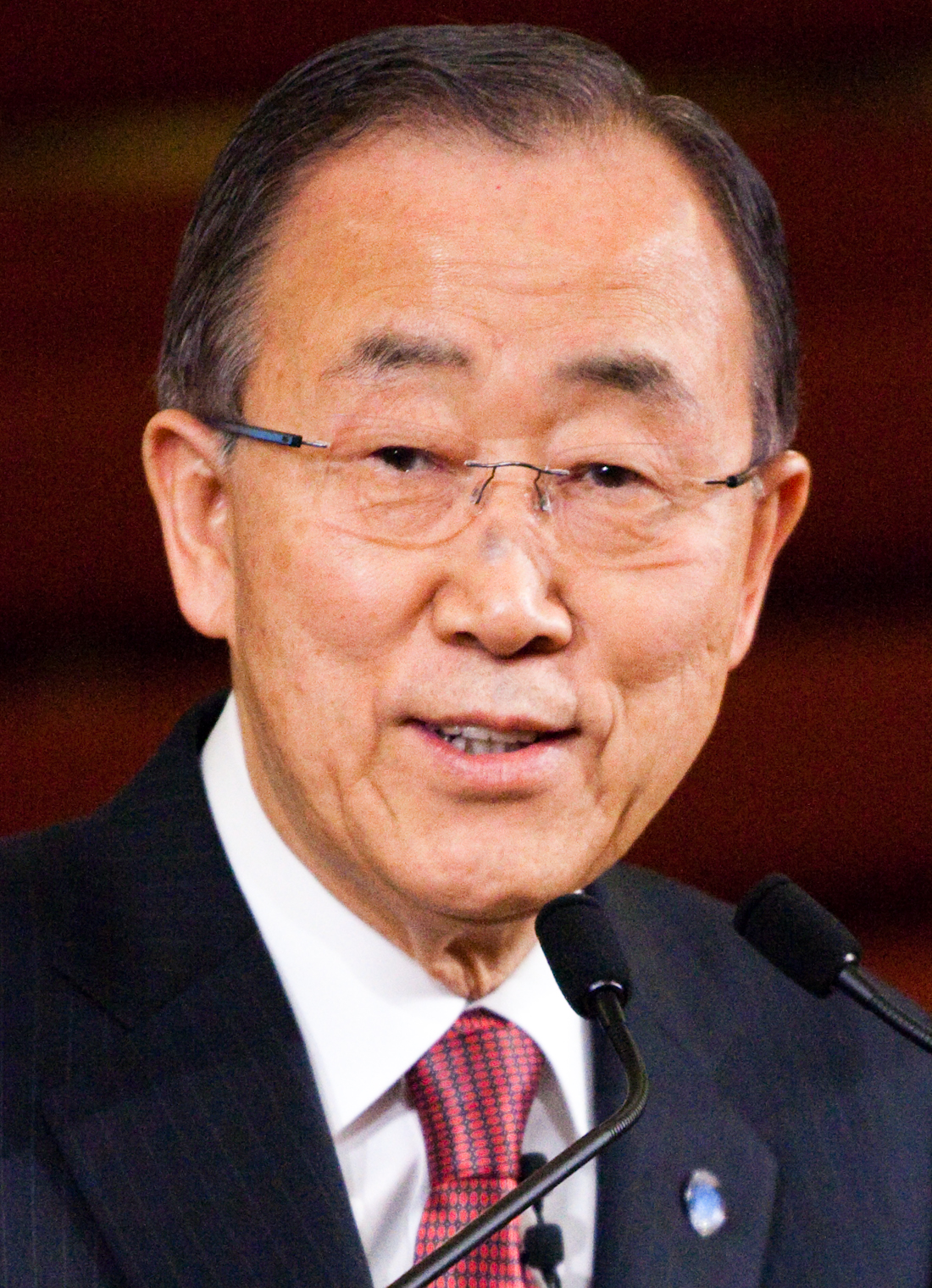
Ban Ki-moon

In the next few years, new humanitarian emergencies emerged, linked to the Ebola epidemic in West Africa, conflicts in Syria, South Sudan and Yemen, the exodus of the Rohingya, and the 2015 Mediterranean Sea migration crisis, among others.

In 2016, the first World Humanitarian Summit was held, in Istanbul, Turkey. It was an initiative of United Nations Secretary-General Ban Ki-moon, aimed to promote the Agenda for Humanity and a series of voluntary commitments towards improving humanitarian funding, empowering local actors, and advancing the nexus between humanitarian action and development cooperation

Attendees at the summit also agreed a pact consisting on a series of reforms on aid spending called the Grand Bargain. It included a commitment to strengthen localisation and spend 25% of aid funds directly through local and national humanitarian aid organizations. As previous reforms, some of its promises saw more progress than others.

=== 2020s ===
Beginning in 2019, the COVID-19 pandemic shook a humanitarian sector that, among ongoing reforms, was growing assymmetrically. The pandemic drove significant changes in digitalisation and delegation of functions to local humanitarian actors, which didn't translate in a greater share of power or direct humanitarian funding.

In 2023, at a time when humanitarian funding was reaching its maximum, and while the Grand Bargain evolved in subsequent updates, Martin Griffiths, the new ERC, also launched the Flagship Initiative, another attempt at humanitarian reform.

In 2025, the new United States administration temporarily paused all projects funded by USAID, before dismantling it. The abrupt reduction in humanitarian funding that followed, at a time of record humanitarian needs, overwhelmed the humanitarian system's capacity to respond.

== See also ==
- Church asylum
- Emergency management
- Humanitarian corridor
- Humanitarian education
- Humanitarian protection
- Humanitarian Response Index
- Vienna Declaration and Programme of Action
- World Humanitarian Day
