= Global Humanitarian Overview =

Annual report

- Language: Arabic, English, French, Spanish
- Subjects: Humanitarian Aid
- Published: 2015, 2016, 2017, 2018, 2019, 2020, 2021, 2022
- Publisher: United Nations Office for the Coordination of Humanitarian Affairs

Global Humanitarian Overview is an annual report published by the United Nations Office for the Coordination of Humanitarian Affairs.

It documents how many people have unmet humanitarian needs and the funding that is needed by humanitarian agencies to meet them.

Over the years the annual editions have identified rising needs, insufficient spending, and patterns of violence towards humanitarian healthcare staff.

== Publication ==
United Nations Office for the Coordination of Humanitarian Affairs logo

Global Humanitarian Overview is published by the United Nations Office for the Coordination of Humanitarian Affairs.

It has been published annually since 2015, and is available in Arabic, English, French, and Spanish.

== Format ==
Global Humanitarian Overview documents global trends in humanitarian aid including conflict, climate events, disease, food insecurity, and compliance with international humanitarian law. The report tracks patterns of humanitarian needs, aid spending and the gap between them.

== Notable highlights from selected editions ==
=== Global Humanitarian Overview 2015 ===
In 2015 the inaugural edition, the United Nations Office for the Coordination of Humanitarian Affairs reported that humanitarian needs had risen by 500% in the past ten years and that by June 2015, only 26% of the needs were funded by the world's governments.

The agency needed $16 billion of funding to support 57.5 people in emergencies in 22 countries.

=== Global Humanitarian Overview 2017 ===
In 2017 the report documented the closure of eleven healthcare facilities in Sudan due to a funding shortfall. Areas with high needs also included Libya, South Sudan, Syria, and Yemen, with the total funding needed to meet all needs being $22 billion.

=== Global Humanitarian Overview 2018 ===
In 2018 the report documented 158 major violent incidents affected humanitarian workers in 22 countries, including 72 abductions and 139 homicides.

The report documented the needs of 134 million people in 42 countries and a 40% gap between the cost of meeting their needs and the funding provided.

=== Global Humanitarian Overview 2019 ===
The 2019 recorded a record level of attacks on healthcare workers and predicted dire circumstances for people living in poverty as a consequence of the climate emergency and armed conflict. It reported that compliance with international humanitarian law was falling, putting healthcare workers in dangervand reducing their ability to meet health needs. It reported a need for humanitarian workers must collaborate with international development workers to increase community resilience to volatile situations.

=== Global Humanitarian Overview 2020 ===
In 2020 the report documented the highest number of people in need in decades, with the number of people with humanitarian needs reaching 168 million. The report called for $28.8 billion of funding.

=== Global Humanitarian Overview 2021 ===
$35 billion of needs were identified, significantly exacerbated by the COVID-19 pandemic. One in 33 people globally had unmet humanitarian needs, up from one in 45 in 2020.

=== Global Humanitarian Overview 2022 ===
A record level of $41 billion worth of needs were identified, with 183 million people in need of life-saving assistance. Afghanistan, Ethiopia, Sudan, and Yemen were identified as the countries with the highest needs. Climate change, conflict and the COVID-19 pandemic were identified as the key causes of unmet needs.
