= Shelter Cluster =

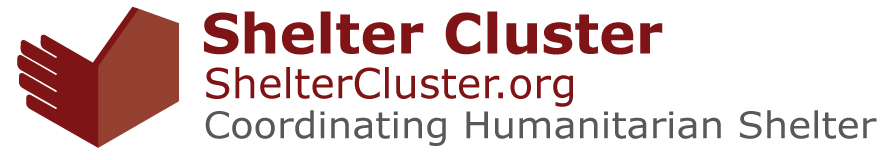
- Logo of the Shelter Cluster
- Formation: 2006
- Type: Coordination mechanism
- Purpose: Coordinate humanitarian shelter
- Global Shelter Cluster Coordinator: Brett Moore, UNHCR
- Global Shelter Cluster Coordinator: Ela Serdaroglu, IFRC
- Affiliations: Inter-Agency Standing Committee
- Website: www.sheltercluster.org
- Formerly called: Emergency Shelter Cluster

The Shelter Cluster is an Inter-Agency Standing Committee (IASC) coordination mechanism that supports people affected by disasters and conflicts with the means to live in safe, dignified and appropriate shelter. The Shelter Cluster is one of eleven sectorial coordination groups that are part of the Cluster Approach, that followed the Humanitarian Response Review in 2005. Currently 43 humanitarian organizations are part of the Shelter Cluster at global level, more than 500 organizations coordinate shelter assistance with the support of the Shelter Cluster at country level.

The Shelter Cluster’s scope includes all activities related to achieving the right to adequate housing with a humanitarian focus. This includes:

- emergency and longer term shelter support;
- shelter-related non-food-items (NFIs);
- housing construction and reconstruction;
- settlement support such as site planning and urban planning shelter preparedness and risk reduction.

== Structure ==
The Global Shelter Cluster is co-chaired by the United Nations High Commissioner for Refugees (UNHCR) and the International Federation of Red Cross and Red Crescent Societies (IFRC). The IFRC convenes the Shelter Cluster in natural disaster situations. UNHCR leads the Shelter Cluster in conflict situations where there are Internally displaced persons, whereas in refugee situations the core mandate of UNHCR takes precedence over the cluster system. The IFRC is convening the Cluster and not leading it because, as a neutral and impartial organization, it cannot be part of the command structure of the United Nations. This difference was formalized in Memorandum of Understanding between the IFRC and The United Nations Office for the Coordination of Humanitarian Affairs.

The structure of the Global Shelter Cluster includes:

- Global Shelter Cluster Meeting: the highest governing body of the Global Shelter Cluster. It meets twice a year to review progress against agreed objectives and define the Global Shelter Cluster strategic direction and annual priorities. It appoints members of the Strategic Advisory Group (SAG).
- Strategic Advisory Group (SAG): a permanent body that works to advance the Cluster’s strategic direction and overall work plan. The SAG is elected by and composed of agencies and institutions that are part of the Global Shelter Cluster.
- 31 active clusters in countries affected by conflicts or natural hazards.

The Shelter Cluster’s structure also include working groups, communities of practice and other support mechanisms.

== Operations ==
Since its inception in 2006, the Shelter Cluster has supported the coordination of humanitarian shelter assistance in over 60 responses in Africa, Americas, Asia, Europe, Middle East and the Pacific regions, .

The Global Shelter Cluster website collects and shares documents related to the cluster responses in the affected countries.
