= Logistics Cluster =

Coordination mechanism for emergency response

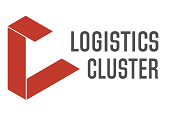
- Logistics Cluster Logo
- Formation: 2005
- Type: Coordination mechanism
- Purpose: Coordinate humanitarian logistics
- Global Cluster Coordinator: Mailin Fauchon
- Affiliations: Inter-Agency Standing Committee, World Food Programme
- Website: logcluster.org

The Logistics Cluster is a coordination mechanism established by the Inter-Agency Standing Committee (IASC), activated to ensure an efficient and effective emergency response.

The basis for the current international humanitarian coordination system was set by General Assembly resolution 46/182 in December 1991 and extended in the Humanitarian Reform of 2005, with new elements to improve capacity, predictability, accountability, leadership, and partnership in humanitarian emergency missions.

Following the recommendations of an independent Humanitarian Response Review in 2005, the cluster approach was proposed as a way of addressing gaps and strengthening the effectiveness of humanitarian response through partnerships.

The Logistics Cluster is one of the eleven sectorial coordination bodies key to emergency response. The United Nations World Food Programme was mandated by the IASC to be the lead agency of the Logistics Cluster by reason of its expertise in humanitarian logistics.

== Operations ==
From its headquarters in Rome, the Global Logistics Cluster coordinates and provides support to the humanitarian community and to national authorities in emergency responses and deploys staff, as needed, to provide additional logistics support and coordinate logistics activities. The Logistics Cluster is operational in sudden-onset emergencies, conflicts, and complex and protracted crises.

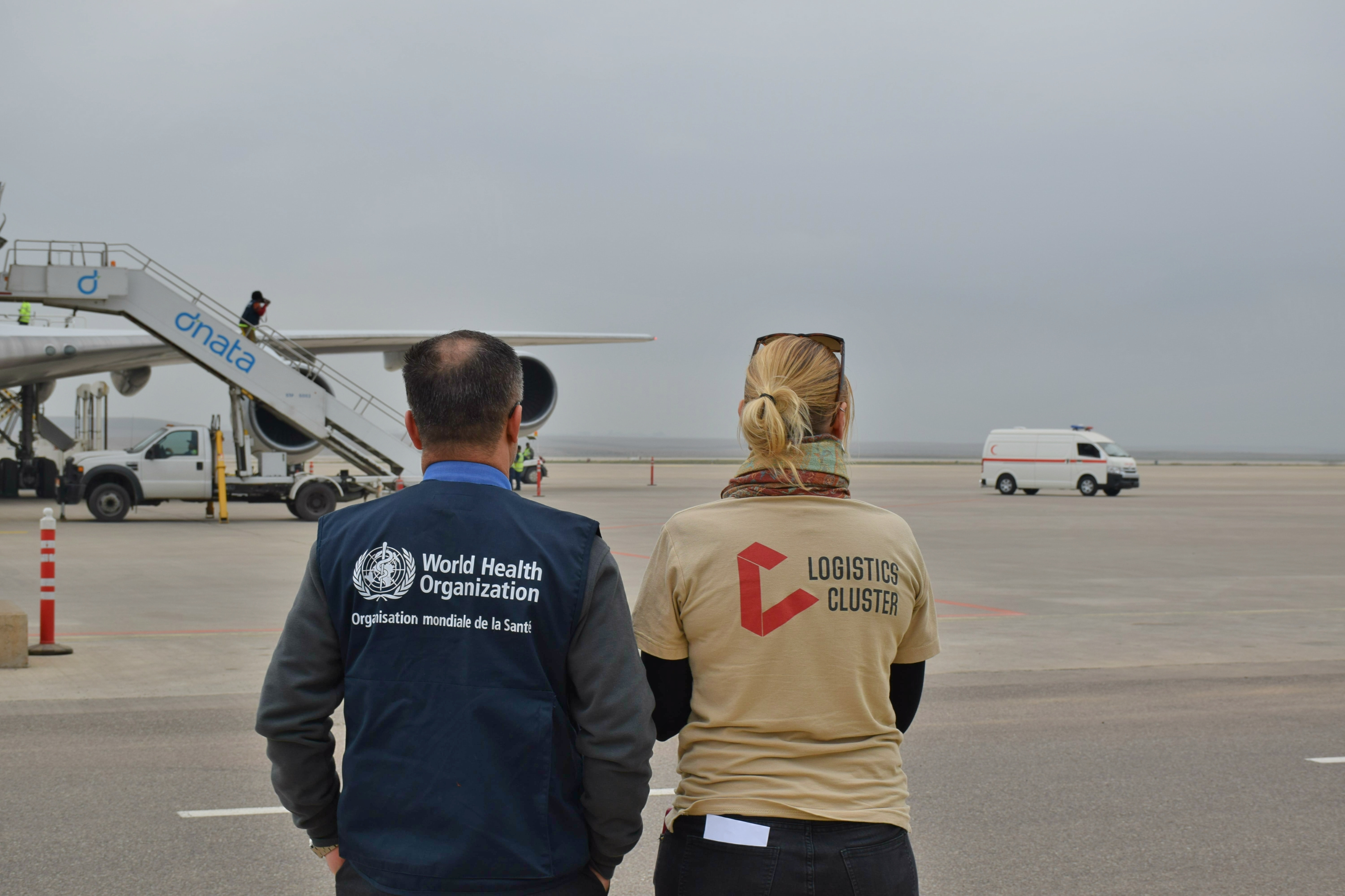
Logistics Cluster and WHO staff in Iraq in 2017

== Information Management ==
Information Management (IM) is the unit responsible for collecting, analysing, and disseminating logistics information to assist field operations. Information Management Officers are regularly deployed to the field, coordinating with their counterparts in Rome with the aim of providing accurate, timely, and reliable information to the humanitarian community.

== Logistics Cluster Strategy 2016–2021 ==
The four goals of the Logistics Cluster Strategy 2016–2021 are: strengthen logistics preparedness of national actors, network and engage with diverse stakeholders, enhance the logistics cluster operational capacity, and learn and drive best practices.

Included in this strategy, the Logistics Cluster values guiding its operations are accountability, partnership, professionalism and independence, and sustainability and resilience.

== Strategic Advisory Group ==
The Strategic Advisory Group (SAG) of the Logistics Cluster is charged with "providing strategic support and guidance, improving accountability, facilitating decision making and fostering shared ownership of the cluster". Established in early 2017, the SAG is composed of eight members, all of whom are senior humanitarian logisticians. Five of them are elected by Logistics Cluster partners, one seat is reserved for the World Food Programme—as lead agency of the Logistics Cluster—and one seat is held by the Logistics Cluster Coordinator of a field operation. The Chair of the SAG is held by the Global Logistics Cluster Coordinator.

== Global Meetings ==
Twice a year, humanitarian logisticians from different organisations gather for the Logistics Cluster Global Meeting. The event provides the wider community with a forum to discuss trends and developments in supply chain management and logistics in the context of humanitarian emergencies.

== Training ==
The Logistics Cluster provides training and guidance for humanitarian responders at both national and global levels. The following trainings are currently available: Logistics Cluster Induction Training (LCIT), Logistics Response Team Training (LRT), Information Management Training (IMT), Logistics Cluster Coordination Training (LCCT), Logistics Emergency Team Training (LET), Service Mindset Training (SMT), Awareness Training (AWT), Emergency Logistics Induction Training (ELIT), and Access Training.

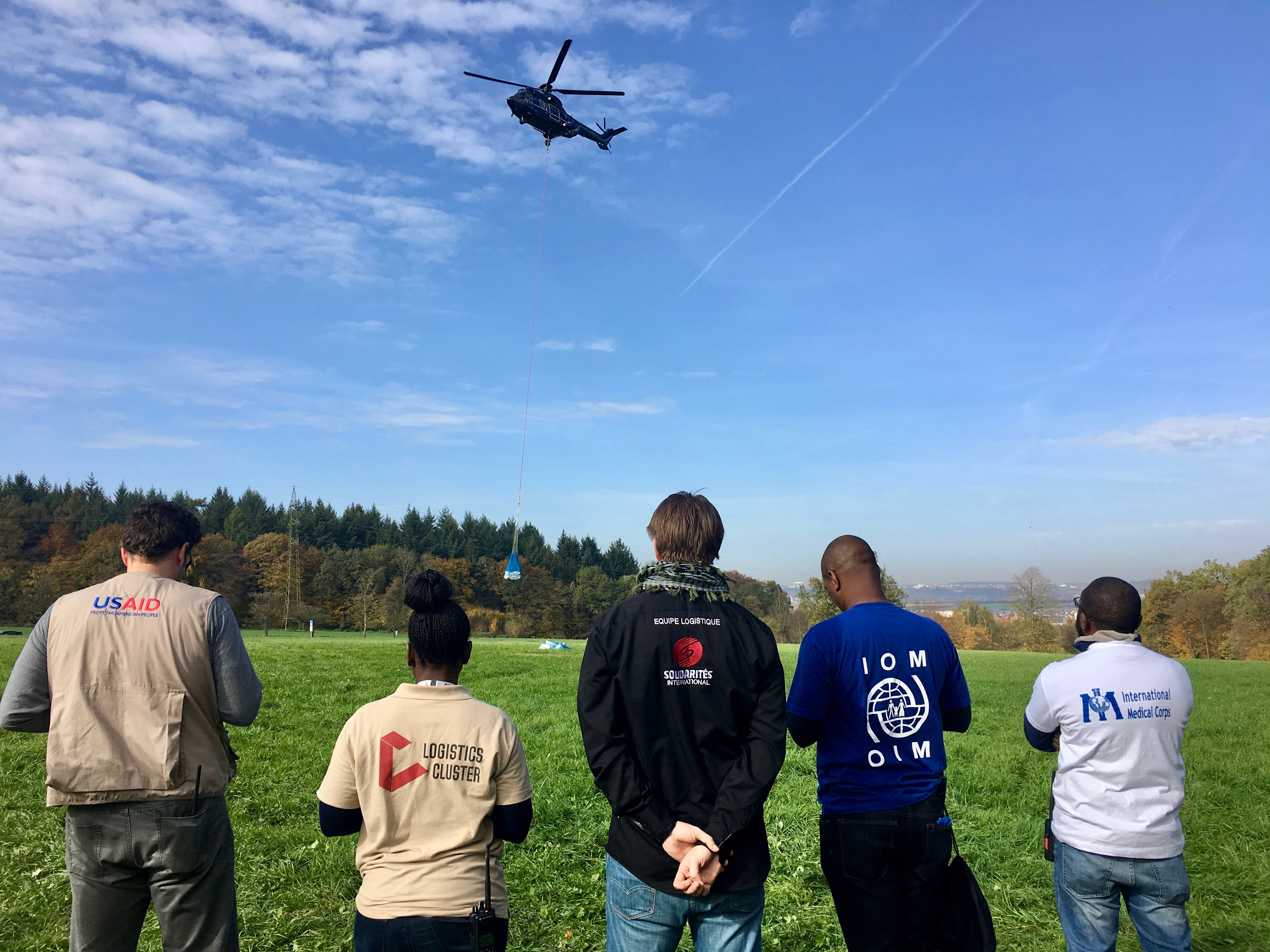
LRT Training in Germany in 2017

== Preparedness ==
Preparedness is one of the pillars of the 2016–2021 Strategy of the Logistics Cluster. Based on risk indices, and performance and capacity indicators, in 2016 six disaster-prone or risk-prone countries were identified by the Logistics Cluster as pilots for preparedness programmes.

== Logistics Capacity Assessments ==
The Logistics Capacity Assessment (LCA) is a tool created by the World Food Programme and managed jointly with the Logistics Cluster. The purpose of the LCA is to provide updated information on the logistics infrastructure and services in a country. The information is focused on potential needs and requirements arising in the event of a humanitarian emergency. As of December 2017, 91 LCAs are available.
