= ALNAP =

UK-based non-profit organization

- Active Learning Network for Accountability and Performance in Humanitarian Action
- Founded: 1997
- Type: Non-governmental organization
- Purpose: Humanitarian Aid
- Location: London, England
- Region served: Worldwide
- Products: The State of the Humanitarian System Report

ALNAP (Active Learning Network for Accountability and Performance) is a UK based non-profit organization that works to increase learning and accountability in the humanitarian aid sector.

It produces The State of the Humanitarian System report every two to three years.

== History ==
ALNAP was created to increase learning and accountability in the humanitarian sector in the aftermath of the Rwandan genocide.

== Selected publications ==
In 2010 ALNAP released the first The State of the Humanitarian System report, which was updated in 2012, 2015 and 2018.

It released the report Urban services during protracted armed conflict: A call for a better approach to assisting affected people in 2015.

== Members ==
ALNAP is a membership organization. As of January 2022 it had 86 full members and 16 Associate members.
