= Inter-Agency Standing Committee =

The Inter-Agency Standing Committee (IASC) is an inter-agency forum of United Nations and non-UN humanitarian partners founded in 1991 to strengthen humanitarian assistance. The overall objective of the IASC is to improve the delivery of humanitarian assistance to affected populations. The Committee was established following UN General Assembly Resolution 46/182 and resolution 48/57 confirmed that it should be the primary method for inter-agency coordination. The committee is chaired by the Emergency Relief Coordinator.

== Members ==
IASC members are:

- Food and Agriculture Organization (FAO)
- The American Council for Voluntary International Action (InterAction)
- the International Council for Voluntary Agencies (ICVA)
- the Representative of the United Nations Secretary General on Internally Displaced Persons
- the Steering Committee for Humanitarian Response (SCHR)
- UNICEF
- United Nations Development Program (UNDP)
- United Nations High Commissioner for Refugees (UNHCR)
- United Nations Population Fund (UNFPA)
- the World Bank
- World Food Programme (WFP)
- World Health Organization (WHO)
- United Nations Office for the Coordination of Humanitarian Affairs (OCHA)
- United Nations Development Program (UNDP)
- United Nations Population Fund (UNFPA)

Standing invitees of the IASC are:

- the International Committee of the Red Cross (ICRC)
- the International Federation of Red Cross and Red Crescent Societies (IFRC)
- the International Organization for Migration

== Global Clusters ==
Following the recommendations of an independent Humanitarian Response Review in 2005, the cluster approach was adopted in 2005 as a way of addressing gaps and strengthening the effectiveness of humanitarian response through building partnerships. The IASC clustered similar humanitarian organizations and appointed lead agencies for each. There are 11 clusters which are humanitarian coordination mechanisms of the Inter-Agency Standing Committee:

1. Camp Coordination and Camp Management
2. Early Recovery
3. Education
4. Emergency Telecommunications
5. Food Security
6. Health
7. Logistics
8. Nutrition
9. Protection
10. Shelter
11. Water, Sanitation and Hygiene
