= ECB Project =

Emergency Capacity Building (ECB) Project
- Founded: 2004
- Type: Non-governmental organization
- Purpose: accountability and impact measurement, disaster risk reduction and national staff capacity building
- Region served: Bangladesh, Bolivia, Horn of Africa, Indonesia and Niger with projects worldwide
- Method: training, research, innovation

The Emergency Capacity Building Project (ECB Project) is a collaborative capacity-building project aimed at improving the speed, effectiveness and delivery of humanitarian response programs. The ECB Project is a partnership between seven non-governmental organizations (NGOs) including CARE, International Rescue Committee, Catholic Relief Services, Mercy Corps, Oxfam, Save the Children, and World Vision, and implements programs in one region and four countries known as consortia (the Horn of Africa, Bolivia, Bangladesh, Indonesia and Niger).

== Background ==
The ECB Project concept came about through a series of meetings that began in 2003-2004 between members of the Inter-Agency Working Group (IWG). This group of NGOs includes the six ECB partners and the International Rescue Committee (IRC) who together shared the challenges of working in the humanitarian sector, and identified key capacity needs for their humanitarian response staff. These discussions led to the definition of the core themes of the project in Phase II: accountability and impact measurement, disaster risk reduction and staff capacity. The results of these findings were shared in a report entitled Report on Emergency Capacity, published in 2004. The project's core funding began with the Bill & Melinda Gates Foundation, and has since expanded to include support from the Department for International Development (DFID / UKAID), United States Agency for International Development's Office for Foreign Disaster Assistance (USAID/OFDA) and the ECHO (European Commission).

== Phase II (2008–2013) ==
Phase II of the ECB Project included multiple objectives and program activities which were developed by teams within the five field consortia, including technical advisors from each thematic area (accountability and impact measurement, disaster risk reduction and staff capacity) and global level technical specialists from within the ECB partnering NGOs. Each of the five country or regional-level consortia was led by a different ECB organization, working closely with ECB agencies and other NGOs, INGOs and partners from across the humanitarian sector. Each program activity had a variety of outputs and learning materials that were shared and made freely available across the wider humanitarian community. The Project's website has more information about all of the initiatives that were undertaken and the resources that were produced, including a number of case studies that document stakeholder learning.

== ECB Project consortia ==
The major themes of the project are integrated into the work of the five ECB Project consortia (Bangladesh, Bolivia, Horn of Africa, Indonesia, and Niger). These five consortia are made up of the ECB partnering agencies at the global level together with additional partners in each country. The consortia develop their own program activities using ECB tools and approaches to improve upon their capacity to respond to disasters and develop their knowledge and skills around disaster risk reduction, accountability and impact measurement. Recent collaboration has led to joint emergency programming for Needs Assessments in Bolivia and Indonesia, and the development of disaster engagement protocols in Indonesia and expected soon in Bangladesh.

=== Good Enough Guide ===
The Good Enough Guide: Impact Measurement and Accountability in Emergencies is a free, downloadable tool that is one of the results of the collaboration between partners in the ECB Project. It is a guide focused on accountability to beneficiaries, and provides guidelines and practical tools on how to ensure that beneficiaries are involved in every step of the process in a humanitarian emergency: "In The Good Enough Guide, accountability means making sure that the women, men, and children affected by an emergency are involved in planning, implementing, and judging our response to their emergency too. This helps ensure that a project will have the impact they want to see." The Good Enough Guide, currently available in 14 languages, is accompanied by communications materials such as posters, leaflets and films, as well as a Training of Trainers module. All tools are available in several languages.

In 2015, the Good Enough Guide: Humanitarian Needs Assessments was published in collaboration with Assessments Capacities Project (ACAPS).

=== Building trust in diverse teams ===
This facilitation handbook, also freely available for download, is designed to build trust in situations where diverse teams are coming together for humanitarian emergencies. The Building Trust handbook includes exercises on measuring trust between team members (for instance, a Trust Index), as well as a number of ice-breakers. This tool supports emergency teams in building staff capacity during emergencies.

=== Joint needs assessments (JNAs) ===
Needs assessments are conducted in order to determine the needs of beneficiaries in the first 72 hours following a disaster. Multi-agency, or joint needs assessments are increasingly perceived as being more beneficial than single-agency assessments as they provide better opportunities for improved coordination, and prioritization of assistance both in terms of resources and geographically The ECB Project developed the joint needs assessment template and tools so that agencies could begin to coordinate their disaster response programs, and co-develop operating procedures, common standards and a common platform for assessment data capture in ECB countries.

=== Joint evaluations ===
Several joint evaluations have been undertaken by ECB NGO agencies, following natural disasters such as the 2010 Haiti earthquake and the 2006 Yogyakarta earthquake in Indonesia. A guide entitled What We Know About Joint Evaluations of Humanitarian Action: Learning from NGO Experiences assists humanitarian organizations with practical guidelines on how to effectively conduct a joint evaluation. This tool also includes a number of practical tips and templates.

=== Simulations ===
Simulation exercises in the humanitarian sector are meant to prepare humanitarian staff for emergencies, such as quick onset disasters. Simulation participants engage with disaster scenarios such as floods or landslides, with the expectation that participants will be able to practice and reflect upon their response strategies and therefore be better equipped to deal with future disasters. In Phase II of the ECB Project, there have been multi-agency simulations in Niger, Uganda, Bolivia, Kenya and Bangladesh in partnership with many different stakeholders, including UNICEF and local NGOs.

==== Simulations Administrators Guide ====
The Simulations Administrators Guide is designed for trainers and facilitators in the humanitarian sector to prepare for and implement a single or multi-agency Simulation exercises. The Simulations tools which accompany the guide are designed to support the detailed planning and preparation required for a simulation and consists of materials including a detailed timeline form, evaluation forms, situation report templates, and role-playing materials.

== Themes ==
=== Accountability and impact measurement ===
Accountability and impact measurement for the ECB Project team is focussed on the ways in which NGOs provide information to beneficiaries in times of crisis, and how agencies can measure the effectiveness of the assistance they provide. "Evaluations of emergency response frequently highlight insufficient accountability, especially to the people affected by emergencies, such as failure to provide communities with even the simplest information on what programs are there, and why. Country offices often lack clearly defined accountability frameworks and related tools that would enable them to systematically assess performance and ensure their response meets sector-accepted quality standards."

The ECB Project has engaged with this theme through the development of reports, tools and inter-agency activities. Some of these include the Good Enough Guide, Joint Evaluations and Joint Needs Assessments. The Project also works with partners in Quality and Accountability Initiatives including ALNAP, Humanitarian Accountability Partnership International, People in Aid and the Sphere Project. The Department for International Development is funding a new specialist Good Enough Guide to Impact Measurement, which will be most useful for rapid-onset natural disasters. This guide is being developed in partnership with the University of East Anglia.

=== Staff Capacity ===
The Staff Capacity theme of the Project encompasses several sub-themes, all of which are aimed at increasing staff capacity to respond to humanitarian emergencies and engage in disaster preparedness at the national level. The ECB Project is working with the Consortium of British Humanitarian Agencies (CBHA) to support the implementation of their Humanitarian Staff Development Project and two core programs designed to build staff capacity at the national level: the Humanitarian Management & Leadership Skills Development Programme, and the Humanitarian Core Skills Development Programme. In addition, the ECB Project published recent findings on addressing the challenges of staff retention with a case study of the Horn of Africa in partnership with People in Aid.

=== Disaster risk reduction ===
The ECB Project website describes disaster risk reduction (DRR) as "the process by which disaster risks and vulnerabilities are identified, analyzed, and minimized to avoid or limit the adverse impacts of hazards". UNISDR (2007) defines DRR as "the concept and practice of reducing disaster risks through systematic efforts to analyze and manage the causal factors of disasters, including through reduced exposure to hazards, lessened vulnerability of people and property, wise management of land and the environment, and improved preparedness for adverse events". DRR encompasses early warning and prevention systems, disaster preparedness, and disaster risk management, and can take the form of disaster risk tracking systems and training of nationals in disaster preparedness. The ECB Project consortia have developed programs designed to raise awareness of disaster risk reduction as well as improve capacity in DRR at the local level. Toward Resilience: A Guide to Disaster Risk Reduction and Climate Change Adaptation was developed by a specialist committee within the ECB Project.

== Partnerships and networks ==
The ECB Project works with several partners and networks in the sector, sharing learning, and drawing on the work of various organizations. Some of these partners include ALNAP, Sphere Project, Consortium of British Humanitarian Agencies, Humanitarian Accountability Partnership International, People in Aid, Humanitarian Practice Network and the Inter-Agency Working Group.

The Project partners have collaborated to publish papers with the Humanitarian Practice Network, which include "Getting better results from partnership working", and "NGO–government partnerships for disaster preparedness in Bangladesh".

== Working with the United Nations (UN) ==
ECB Project teams have collaborated extensively with several UN institutions including UNOCHA, UNISDR, UNICEF, WFP, and UNDP. ECB stakeholders have supported the work of the Inter-Agency Standing Committee (IASC) including presentations during the 2011 Global Platform on Disaster Risk Reduction and planned further work together on activities including joint simulations. In May 2011 the ECB Project worked with the IASC to contribute to a paper entitled "Preparedness: Saves Time, Money and Lives".
