= Andrew Morley =

Andrew Morley may refer to:

- Andrew James Morley (born 1989), Australian actor
- Andrew Morley (humanitarian), British non-profit executive

== See also ==
- Andrew Morey, New Zealand cricketer
