= The State of the World's Cash 2020 =

Report about use of cash in humanitarian responses

- Authors: Jose Jodar; Anna Kondakhchyan; Ruth McCormack; Karen Peachey; Laura Phelps; Gaby Smith
- Language: English
- Subject: Cash and Voucher Assistance
- Genre: Non-fiction
- Published: 2020
- Publisher: CALP Network
- Pages: 181

The State of the World's Cash 2020 is a publication by CALP Network that reports on the use of cash and voucher assistance in humanitarian aid.

It was written by Jose Jodar, Anna Kondakhchyan, Ruth McCormack, Karen Peachey, Laura Phelps and Gaby Smith.

== Background ==
The report follows on from "The State of the World's Cash Report", a seminal piece published by CALP in 2018.

The report reflects on progress made against global policy commitments made by the Grand Bargain, ECHO's 10 Principles, the High Level Panel on Cash and the World Bank's Strategic Note on Cash Transfers in Humanitarian Contexts among others. These and other policy commitments are summarised in the Global Framework for Action: A Consolidated Summary of Commitments for Cash Transfer Programming which provides the overall structure to the State of the World's Cash Report with additional chapters to reflect new trends and issues.

This document is widely cited and used both by policy makers and practitioners. It is a source referenced in the annual review of progress against Grand Bargain commitments and in multiple other authoritative research, policy and guidance reports.

== Synopsis ==
It documents how the use of cash and voucher assistance (CVA) in humanitarian aid has doubled from US$2.8 billion in 2016, to $5.6 billion in 2019, representing 17.9% of spending on humanitarian assistance. Chapter by chapter it examines progress made on priority issues and includes recommendations for humanitarian policy makers and practitioners.

- Chapter 1 focuses on Funding, Policies, Volume, and Collaboration.
- Chapter 2 looks at Mainstreaming CVA – Progress Risks and Challenges.
- Chapter 3 explores the question of Quality Programming.
- Chapter 4 digs into Building Sufficient Capacity for Cash and Voucher Assistance.
- Chapter 5 examines questions issues related to Coordination. It documents ambiguity around coordination of CVA activities and the impact that has on delivery of humanitarian aid and effectiveness of the program.
- Chapter 6 has two sections – the first part focuses on Evidence and the second on Investing in Innovation.
- Chapter 7 examines questions related to Support to CVA Integration with Local Systems.
- Chapter 8 focuses on linkages between social protection and CVA, looking at how humanitarian agencies can work closer with national governments.
- Chapter 9 was a late addition to the report, written in the early days of the COVID-19 it looked ahead at what the pandemic might mean for the use of CVA.
