= Health Poverty Action =

Health Ltd trading as Health Poverty Action
- Formation: 1 August 1984; 41 years ago
- Founded at: United Kingdom
- Type: Private company limited by guarantee without share capital No. 01837621
- Registration no.: Registered Charity in England and Wales No. 290535
- Legal status: Live
- Purpose: From charity objects: "We work to improve the health of the world's poorest people, ensuring people who otherwise would have no support receive basic but life-saving health care and education."
- Headquarters: London
- Location: United Kingdom
- Chair: Professor Emma Crewe
- Director: Martin Drewry
- Revenue: £13.2m (2014/15)
- Expenses: £14.3m (2014/15)
- Staff: 393 (2014/15)
- Website: www.healthpovertyaction.org
- Formerly called: Traded as "Health Unlimited" until 2010

Health Poverty Action is a British non-governmental organisation, founded in 1984 as "Health Unlimited", that aims to secure health care access for marginalised communities in developing countries. Working with communities and health service providers, they undertake long-term projects targeted at women and children in remote, often war-torn areas. They prioritize projects focusing on indigenous communities and communities affected by conflict and political instability.

The organisation aims to bring sustainable solutions to people suffering from poor health due to war, poverty, or marginalization from care for other reasons.

== History ==
Health Poverty Action was founded in 1984. Its first programme was in southern Afghanistan, where the founders of the organisation recognised the strong link between war and health. They provided care and assistance to communities in Afghanistan during the 1980s and early 1990s. They have also aided communities in The Karen, Kachin, and Wa, in the hills of Burma for more than 15 years.

At the time, Health Unlimited offered short courses to orientate health care professionals in the UK to development needs, for example in May 1993 there was a course called Learning to Teach which provided guidance for those travelling to low income settings to offer health promotion interventions.

In March 2010, Health Unlimited changed its name to better reflect its work and so that its purpose would be more recognisable.

== Approach ==
Health Poverty Action aims to improve health services and immunisation programmes in communities in need. With a view to allowing for the people to become self-sustaining, attention is also given to nutrition, access to water, sanitation and income generation.

Alerting local authorities to the need for better health service is a big part of the work of Health Poverty Action. Equipping the affected communities to voice their concerns to their local authorities is an important part of this; however, they also campaign to the governments of leading nations to lead the way in providing better health services to victimised and marginalised people. In theory, this will help everyone, not just those people that Health Poverty Action already runs programmes for.

Health Poverty Action subscribes to the People In Aid Code of Good Practice, an internationally recognised management tool that helps agencies enhance the quality of their human resources management.

== Current ==
Health Poverty Action is now supporting programmes in 12 countries across Africa, Asia and Latin America. They have established relationships with many indigenous peoples and ethnic minorities such as:

- The San in Namibia.
- The Maya K'iche' in Guatemala in the aftermath of the civil war.
- The Quechua in Peru.
- The Bunong, Jarai, Kreung and Tampoeun in Cambodia.
- The Taleang, Tampoeun and Oye in southern Laos.

== See also ==
- ARCHIVE Institute.
