= Core Humanitarian Standard on Quality and Accountability =

Danish non-profit

Core Humanitarian Standard on Quality and Accountability (CHS)
- Formation: 2014
- Legal status: Non-profit organisation
- Website: http://corehumanitarianstandard.org

The Core Humanitarian Standard on Quality and Accountability (CHS) sets out nine commitments for humanitarian and development actors to measure and improve the quality and effectiveness of their assistance. The CHS places communities and people affected by crisis at the centre of humanitarian action. Humanitarian organisations may use it as a voluntary code with which to align their own internal procedures. It can also be used as a basis for verification of performance.

The CHS was launched on 12 December 2014 in Copenhagen, Denmark as the result of a global consultation process involving 2,000 humanitarian and development practitioners. It draws together key elements of existing humanitarian standards and commitments. The founders and copyright holders of the CHS are Groupe URD, Sphere and the CHS Alliance.

The CHS was updated in 2024 following an extensive global consultation with more than 4,000 people from crisis-affected communities and response organisations across 90 countries. The revision process led to the 2024 edition of the CHS, which is more people-centred with a simplified structure and clearer language, promoting accessibility to a diverse range of actors supporting people in crisis situations.

== Background ==
The Core Humanitarian Standard (CHS) describes the essential elements of principled, accountable and high-quality humanitarian action. Humanitarian organisations may use it as a voluntary code with which to align their own internal procedures. It can also be used as a basis for verification of performance.

The CHS is the result of a 12-month, three-stage consultation facilitated by Humanitarian Accountability Partnership International (HAP), People In Aid and the Sphere Project, during which many hundreds of individuals and organisations rigorously analysed the content of the CHS and tested it at headquarters and field level.

The three founding bodies and copyright holders of the Core Humanitarian Standard are Groupe URD, Sphere, and the CHS Alliance. They play complementary roles, namely:

- The CHS Alliance assists its members and the wider community to promote and implement the CHS; the CHS Verification Scheme allows organisations to measure the extent to which they have successfully applied the Standard.
- Groupe URD helps organisations to improve the quality of their programmes through evaluations, research, training, and strategic and quality support. It has developed the Quality & Accountability COMPASS, which provides guidelines, processes and tools to help implement the CHS in the field.
- Sphere works with humanitarian agencies and individual practitioners to improve the quality and accountability of humanitarian assistance. The Sphere Handbook sets common principles and universal minimum standards in areas of humanitarian response. The Core Humanitarian Standard is one of the three foundational chapters of Sphere, informing and supporting the technical standards, together with the Humanitarian Charter and the Protection Principles.

Besides the CHS Alliance, Sphere and Groupe URD, there are numerous organisations around the world that advocate for, promote and implement the CHS.

== Nine commitments ==
The nine commitments are:

People and communities in situations of crisis and vulnerability...

1. can exercise their rights and participate in actions and decisions that affect them.
2. access timely and effective support in accordance with their specific needs and priorities.
3. are better prepared and more resilient to potential crises.
4. access support that does not cause harm to people or the environment.
5. can safely report concerns and complaints and get them addressed.
6. access coordinated and complementary support.
7. access support that is continually adapted and improved based on feedback and learning.
8. interact with staff and volunteers that are respectful, competent, and well-managed.
9. can expect that resources are managed ethically and responsibly.

== Statements of support ==
The Core Humanitarian Standard (CHS) was created with the ambitious goal to provide the entire humanitarian and development sectors with a common reference framework for quality and accountability. Subsequently, many humanitarian and development organisations adopted the Standard and/or expressed their support.

Some of the notable statements of support are from the European Union, UNDP, UNIDO, International Committee of the Red Cross, Oxfam and from the governments of Denmark, Germany, Ireland, Switzerland and the United Kingdom. Furthermore, it has been featured in key documents such as the Commitments on Accountability to Affected People and Protection from Sexual Exploitation and Abuse (CAAP) by the Inter-Agency Standing Committee (IASC), and the first annual synthesis report published by UNOCHA since the World Humanitarian Summit and entitled ‘No Time to Retreat’ (2017).

“We see the CHS has the clear potential to become an influential framework to set out a common set of commitments and expectations for organisations engaged in principled humanitarian action, based on humanity, impartiality, neutrality and independence.” - International Committee of the Red Cross (ICRC) on the Core Humanitarian Standard

== Utilization ==
Since 2014, the uptake of the CHS is steadily on the increase. Case studies and best practices show that complying with the CHS indeed increases the overall effectiveness and quality of the work of humanitarian and development organisations. For example, putting emphasis on training (Commitment 7, 8) helps to improve the quality and speed of surge response, improving the way of engagement with communities (Commitment 4) helps to obtain quality information and thus a true understanding of people’s realities, and in general, the CHS contributes to making organisations more transparent and to addressing sexual exploitation and abuse (SEA).

== Verification ==
The Core Humanitarian Standard (CHS) is a voluntary and measurable standard, which means its application can be objectively assessed.

Verification is a structured, systematic process to assess the degree to which an organisation is working to achieve the CHS. The Verification Scheme is managed by the CHS Alliance. It sets out the policies and rules of the verification process to ensure it is conducted in a fair and consistent manner for all participating organisations.

The Scheme offers three verification options with different degrees of rigour and confidence in the results. These are self-assessment, independent verification and certification. Although each option is stand alone, the indicators used in the self-assessment are common to all four options.

To avoid potential conflicts of interest and following international good practice, the actual independent auditing is undertaken by a certification body specially established for this purpose and is totally independent from the CHS Alliance, the CHS standard setting process and the organisations it audits. Currently the only such organisation is the Humanitarian Quality Assurance Initiative.
