= Humanitarianism =

Beliefs and activities to aid humanity

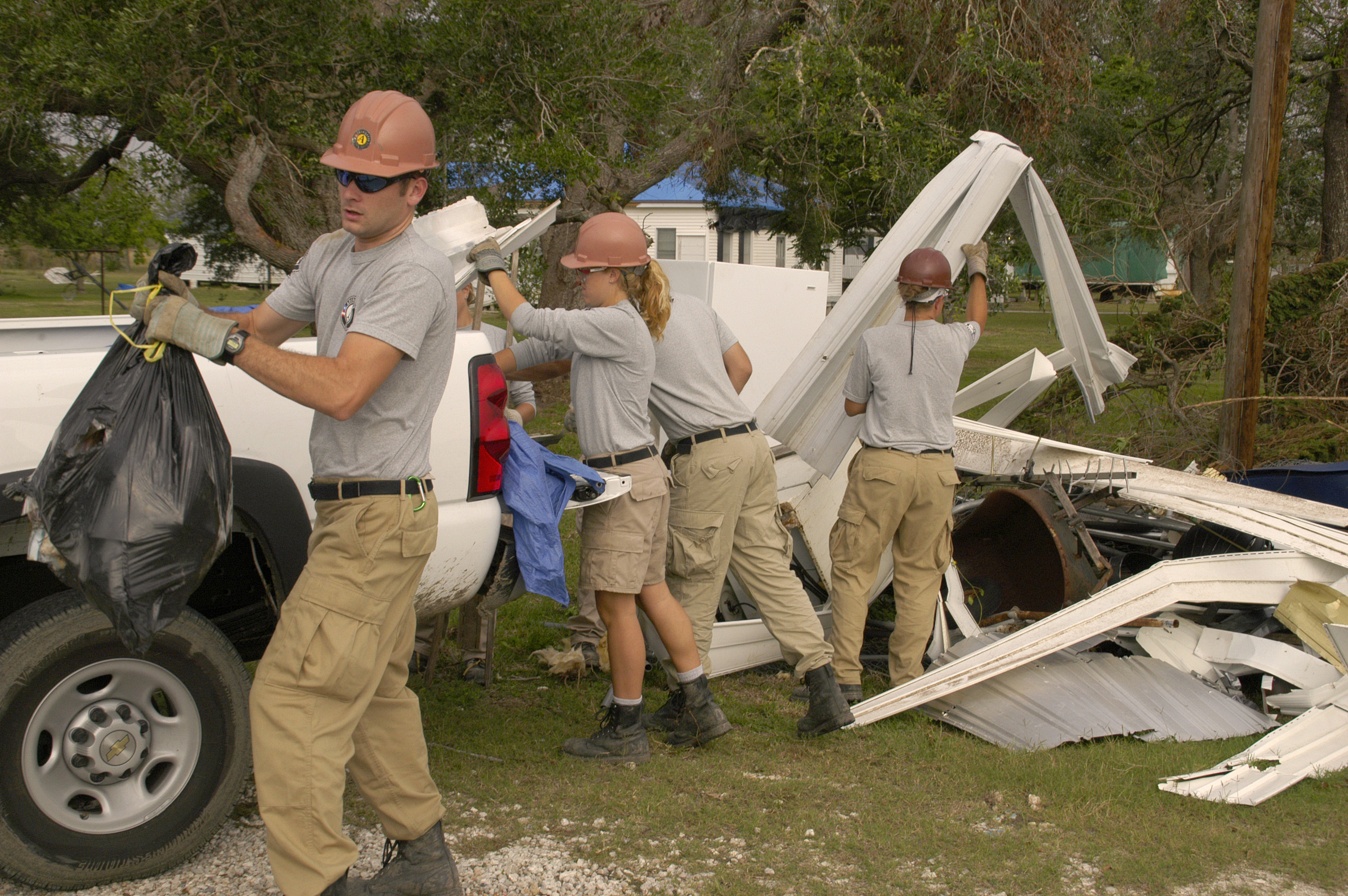
AmeriCorps volunteers, Louisiana, 2005

Humanitarianism is a set of beliefs, practices and principles centered on the value of human life, whereby humans practice benevolent treatment and provide assistance to other humans to reduce suffering and improve the conditions of humanity for moral, altruistic, and emotional reasons. Humanitarian ideals tend to be cosmopolitan, entailing compassion across national borders. In contrast to charity and philanthropy (which apply to both domestic and international projects), humanitarianism tends to involve helping populations affected by international emergencies, such as wars and disasters.

One aspect involves voluntary emergency aid overlapping with human rights advocacy, actions taken by governments, development assistance, and domestic philanthropy. Other critical issues include correlation with religious beliefs, motivation of aid between altruism, market affinity, social control imperialism and neo-colonialism, gender and class relations, and humanitarian agencies. A practitioner is known as a humanitarian.

While humanitarianism on a local and national level can be traced far back in history, scholars of international politics tend to identify the advent of global humanitarian impulses to the 19th century. The founding of the International Red Cross and Red Crescent Movement from 1863 is considered a key juncture in global humanitarianism. The scope of humanitarianism has expanded over time alongside shifting perceptions of who counts as "human" and whose lives are worth saving.

== History ==
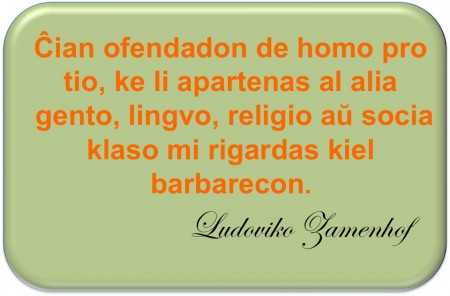
Any insult or oppression of a man because he belongs to another race, another language or another social class than me, I regard as barbaric. L. L. Zamenhof on Homaranismo.

Scholars have generally observed that humanitarianism has increased in scope over time, as individuals and groups have expanded their definition of human life to groups beyond their immediate environment. Humanitarian governance has become increasingly complex and institutionalized over time.

Jean Pictet, in his "The Fundamental Principles of the Red Cross: Commentary", argues for the universal characteristics of humanitarianism:

The wellspring of the principle of humanity is in the essence of social morality which can be summed up in a single sentence, Whatsoever ye would that men should do to you, do ye even so to them. This fundamental precept can be found, in almost identical form, in all the great religions, Brahminism, Buddhism, Christianity, Confucianism, Islam, Judaism and Taoism. It is also the golden rule of the positivists, who do not commit themselves to any religion but only to the data of experience, in the name of reason alone. It is indeed not at all necessary to resort to affective or transcendental concepts to recognize the advantage for men to work together to improve their lot.

== Historical examples and periodization ==
Humanitarianism was publicly seen in the social reforms of the late 1800s and early 1900s, following the economic turmoil of the Industrial Revolution in England. Many of the women in Great Britain who were involved with feminism during the 1900s also pushed humanitarianism. The atrocious hours and working conditions of children and unskilled laborers were made illegal by pressure on Parliament by humanitarians. The Factory Act 1833 and the Factory Act 1844 were some of the most significant humanitarian bills passed in Parliament following the Industrial Revolution.

In the middle of the 19th century, humanitarianism was central to the work of Florence Nightingale and Henry Dunant in emergency response and in the latter case led to the founding of the Red Cross.

The Humanitarian League (1891–1919) was an English advocacy group, formed by Henry S. Salt, which sought to advance the humanitarian cause.

Various suggestions of distinct periods of humanitarianism exist, drawing either on geopolitical or socioeconomic factors that determine humanitarian action. The first approach is exemplified by Michael Barnett's proposition to distinguish ages of "imperial humanitarianism" (late 19th century to 1945), "neo-humanitarianism" (1945–1989), and "liberal humanitarianism" (post-1990). Norbert Götz, Georgina Brewis, and Steffen Werther are advocates of the socioeconomic and cultural approach, arguing that there have been ages of "ad hoc humanitarianism" (up to c. 1900), "organized humanitarianism" (c. 1900–1970), and "expressive humanitarianism" (since 1970). They suggest we might currently be entering "a novel kind of defensive humanitarianism with roots in the expressive age, with automated interfaces, and with thick 'firewalls' between donors and recipients." However, a neat separation between donor and recipient is conventionally difficult to draw. The employment of 'local staff', the active call for help from people in need and the surge in local humanitarian organizations all suggest the intimate relation between donor and recipient.

== Emergency response ==
Today, humanitarianism is particularly used to describe the thinking and doctrines behind the emergency response to humanitarian crises. In such cases it argues for a humanitarian response based on humanitarian principles, particularly the principle of humanity. Nicholas de Torrente, former Executive Director of Médecins Sans Frontières USA writes:

"The most important principles of humanitarian action are humanity, neutrality, independence and impartiality, which posits the conviction that all people have equal dignity by virtue of their being human based solely on need, without discrimination among recipients. Humanitarian organizations must refrain from taking part in hostilities or taking actions that advantage one side of the conflict over another, the action serves the interests of political, religious, or other agendas.

These fundamental principles serve two essential purposes. They embody humanitarian action’s single-minded purpose of alleviating suffering, unconditionally and without any ulterior motive. They also serve as background document to develop operational tools that help in obtaining both the consent of communities for the presence and activities of humanitarian organizations, particularly in highly volatile contexts."

== Digital humanitarianism ==
In 2005, a question was raised as to whether Wikipedia can be seen as digital humanitarianism.

Patrick Meier used the term 'digital humanitarianism' to describe crowdmapping for the 2010 Haiti earthquake. In 2011, Paul Conneally gave a TED talk on digital humanitarianism in which he states that humanitarianism's "origins are firmly rooted in the analogue age" with "a major shift coming". In 2015 he authored the book Digital Humanitarians: How Big Data Is Changing the Face of Humanitarian Response.

Vincent Fevrier notes that "social media can benefit the humanitarian sector... by providing information to give better situational awareness to organisations for broad strategic planning and logistics" and that "crisis mapping really emerged in 2010 during the Haiti earthquake" with "software and digital humanitarian platforms such as Standby Task Force, OpenStreetMap, and many others" being active during many disasters since then.

In fact, the role of social media in digital humanitarian efforts is a considerable one. Ten days after the 2010 earthquake, the "Hope for Haiti Now" telethon event was launched in the United States, effectively taking over the mediasphere and reaching hundreds of millions of households and viewers. It focused on appealing to the viewing public's empathy for the survivors of the disaster, allowing ordinary citizens to help in a collective relief effort by contributing money donations to NGOs providing Humanitarian aid to earthquake survivors. The telethon attracted support through a variety of celebrity musical performances and staged calls for empathy, using digital social networks to disseminate its appeal to the moral responsibility of the viewer-consumers who are able to reinforce identification with a national identity of the American 'savior' through participation in this Humanitarian project.

During the summer of 2010, when open fires raged across Russia, causing many to die from smog inhalation, the use of social media allowed digital humanitarians to map the areas in need of support. This is because Russians who were hoping to be evacuated were posting online about the conditions they were in which prompted thousands of Russian bloggers to coordinate relief efforts online. The digital humanitarian efforts in Russia were crucial to responding to the fires in 2010 considering the Russian government was vastly unprepared to deal with such a large-scale disaster.

Within digital humanitarianism, big data has featured strongly in efforts to improve digital humanitarian work and produces a limited understanding of how a crisis is unfolding. It has been argued that Big Data is constitutive of a social relation in which digital humanitarians claim both the formal humanitarian sector and victims of crises need the services and labor that can be provided by digital humanitarians.

== Examples of humanitarianism ==
Examples of humanitarianism can include:

- Raising funds for people in need
- Medical aid
- Livelihood assistance and financing
- Refugee care
- Education
- Climate change and environment Protection
- Protection of human rights and gender based violence
- Food and water supply
- Providing shelter

== See also ==
- International Committee of the Red Cross
- Consortium of British Humanitarian Agencies
- Human rights
- Humanitarian Accountability Partnership International
- Humanitarian aid
- Humanitarian education
- Humanitarian movement
- Humanitarian principles
- Humanitarianism (Raëlianism)
- Humanity (virtue)
- International Federation of Red Cross and Red Crescent Societies
- International humanitarian law
- International Red Cross and Red Crescent Movement
- International Rescue Committee
- Red Swastika Society, in China
- World Humanitarian Day
- ReliefWeb
- List of National Red Cross and Red Crescent Societies
- UniRef
