= Cash assistance =

Cash assistance may refer to:

- Administration of federal assistance in the United States
- Cash transfer, a direct transfer payment of money to an eligible person
- Cash and Voucher Assistance, humanitarian aid programs that provide cash, or vouchers exchangeable for goods and services, directly to recipients
- Welfare spending, a type of government support intended to ensure that members of a society can meet basic human needs
