= HIJRA =

African humanitarian organization

Humanitarian Initiative Just Relief Aid (HIJRA) is an African humanitarian organization focused on the implementation of emergency and resilience programming in the greater Horn of Africa, Somalia, Kenya, and Uganda.

== Background and Administration ==
Humanitarian Initiative Just Relief Aid (HIJRA) is an international African humanitarian and development organization that aims to positively contribute towards improving the living standards and conditions of those adversely affected by disasters and conflict in the Horn and East Africa. The organization roots are in Somalia, where a devastating humanitarian crisis emerged after the collapse of the Somali state in 1991. This prompted a group of like-minded professionals to come together to form the organization in response to the glaring humanitarian needs.

== Actions ==
HIJRA works to implement water, sanitation and hygiene (WASH); health; education; and livelihood projects, addressing immediate needs at the grassroots level. Program components include the construction of water and sanitation facilities, hygiene promotion, cash distribution, primary healthcare (including communicable disease control), and preventative as well as maternal and child healthcare.

HIJRA is an immediate responder working to provide impartial assistance. As such, the organization works to ensure the safety of its beneficiaries and staff by adhering to a strict policy of transparency, neutrality and accountability. They employ the SPHERE standards before entering new program areas. HIJRA supports community development by hiring locally, drawing staff from local regions, encouraging beneficiaries to participate in program development.

HIJRA is one of the largest organizations in South Central Somalia and provides aid to over 371,000 people in the region.

== Methods ==
The majority of its staff comes from its program areas, supported by a smaller number of international staff. In 2011, HIJRA worked through 126 staff to deliver lifesaving programs in Somalia, Kenya and Uganda. Members and staff of HIJRA make a commitment to the following values:

- Professionalism
- Equality and justice
- Transparency
- Independence and neutrality

HIJRA focuses its work on bridging gaps in aid through strategic partnerships participating in consortiums, working groups and clusters, serving as one of six NGOs in the Somalia Humanitarian Country Team.

== Water, sanitation and hygiene ==
HIJRA's Water, Sanitation and Hygiene (WASH) program focuses on increasing access to services, while building the capacity to manage WASH interventions at the local level.

HIJRA's programs in Somalia and Uganda directly benefits over 400,000 community members: refugees, Internally Displaced Persons (IDPs) and other vulnerable host communities.

Water- and sanitation-related diseases, such as diarrhea and malaria, remain the leading cause of death among children under age five. This is primarily due to a high proportion of non-functioning water supply facilities, poor access to sanitation and low adoption rates of positive hygiene practices.

The overall goal of the organization's programs is to achieve reductions in water and sanitation-related illnesses within the communities we serve in Somalia and Uganda by:

- Increasing access to safe water
- Improving sanitation
- Improving hygiene behavior
- Training and mobilizing community water and sanitation (WASH) committees

== Livelihoods ==
HIJRA's livelihood programs in Somalia and Uganda primarily aim enhance improved resilience and increased adaptive capacities of communities and households, helping them protect their livelihoods amid ongoing shocks.

Program Outcomes:

- Improved access to productive livelihood for enhanced food access.
- Protection of livelihood assets through the establishment of social safety nets;
- Improved capacities of communities to respond to and cope with recurrent shocks stressors.

Program Activities:

- Conducting participatory, in-depth, vulnerability assessments and systems analysis at community level.
- Promote sustainable production and diversification of income through beneficiary training and enhancing household community assets.

== Health ==
HIJRA's programs address the health needs of poor and marginalized communities in South Central Somalia.

Key focus areas include reducing maternal and infant mortality, combating malnutrition, constructing new health facilities and rehabilitating existing infrastructure, training community healthcare workers, providing essential medical equipment, drugs and immunizations.

Besides this, HIJRA is also involved in disease surveillance and response.

An innovative and holistic approach has been integral to HIJRA's health strategy. The cornerstone has been building interlinkages amongst the various stakeholders. HIJRA's training and sensitization of community health workers have improved both the access to and the quality of healthcare within the communities we serve.

HIJRA provides services for the poor and marginalized, especially newborns, children, adolescent girls and mothers. Long-term behavior changes, including inculcating positive health practices, are increasingly evident within the communities.

== Protection ==
HIJRA's protection programming targeting refugees in western Uganda, envisages a community that is able to be self-reliant in the provision of protection for the vulnerable, including unaccompanied and separated children, as well as those at risk of abuse, exploitation and neglect. The program also focuses on the continued reduction of incidents of Sexual and Gender-Based Violence (SGBV).

HIJRA has been able to improve the access to legal aid for Persons-of-Concern by providing pro-bono legal services such as legal representation, facilitating of witnesses and interpreters for court proceedings in addition to other legal services.

The program has also played a role in reducing crime by conducting community policing sessions within and around the settlement while sensitizing the communities on the laws of Uganda.

The program has facilitated the establishment of a well-organized community with security structures that are able to prevent, detect and report crime to relevant authorities; by means of strengthening community-based structures along with building the capacity of several authorities such as the police and members of the Refugee Welfare Committee in charge of defense. Dialogue meetings and community policing were emphasized to ensure peaceful coexistence between host community and refugees.

== Communications and advocacy ==
As a humanitarian group, HIJRA has a duty to protect its beneficiaries from violence and abuse by speaking out about violations of human rights in an attempt to bring these abuses to the world's attention.

HIJRA takes an active role in information exchange by working to support advocacy efforts at the local and international level, ensuring its community's voice is reflected in the development of policy documents, programming and media.

== Funding and accountability ==
HIJRA is a non-profit organization which relies on public, private and government funding. HIJRA receives 90% of its program funds from donors. Funds collected are earmarked into general program themes and distributed at the country level.

HIJRA strives to operate efficiently and to minimize fundraising and administrative costs. In compliance with donor regulations, HIJRA allocates the bulk of funding to direct program costs allowing 5% for indirect expenditures.

HIJRA receives funding from DFID and CIDA through its OXFAM partnership, the Common Humanitarian Fund and the Jolie-Pitt Foundation. HIJRA receives in-kind support from the World Health Organization (WHO), the United Nations Children's Fund (UNICEF) and Rotary International.

The organization further works to ensure the appropriate use of funds and program development through representation on the Somalia Humanitarian Country Team (HCT) and in relevant UN clusters, consortiums and working groups.
