= CAFOD =

UK Catholic overseas development agency

- Catholic Agency for Overseas Development
- Abbreviation: CAFOD
- Type: Nonprofit
- Registration no.: 1160384
- Legal status: Company limited by guarantee
- Purpose: development aid, humanitarian aid
- Headquarters: Romero House, 55 Westminster Bridge Road
- Location: London, United Kingdom
- Coordinates: 51.49833°N 0.10803°W
- Region served: worldwide
- Director: Christine Allen
- Publication: Side by Side
- Affiliations: Caritas Internationalis, Caritas Europa, Disasters Emergency Committee, CHS Alliance
- Revenue: £67,916,000 (2022/2023)
- Staff: 391 (2023)
- Volunteers: 3,344 (2023)
- Website: cafod.org.uk

The Catholic Agency for Overseas Development, commonly known as CAFOD, is an international development and relief charity. It is the official aid agency of the Catholic Church in England and Wales.

CAFOD is part of the global Caritas Internationalis confederation and of Caritas Europa, as well as a member of the Disasters Emergency Committee (DEC). Its work is based on Gospel values and Catholic social teaching.

The Caritas Social Action Network is the agency's counterpart for the domestic work of the Church in England and Wales.

== History ==
CAFOD's origins can be traced back to the launch of a Family Fast Day organised by a group of Catholic women in 1960, who used the money saved through fasting to support a mother and baby clinic in Dominica. The Bishops' Conference of England and Wales registered the charity in 1962. Its current governing document dates from 2015.

In 2015, CAFOD joined the CHS Alliance. One year later, it was certified against the Core Humanitarian Standard on Quality and Accountability with the current certification being valid until 2027.

CAFOD's Director Christine Allen was appointed in March 2019.

In 2020, CAFOD launched a new strategy, Our Common Home, based on Pope Francis' encyclical Laudato Si', which calls for a new definition of progress rooted in integral ecology, recognising that everything is connected and hearing both the cry of the earth and the cry of the poor, calling on all people to dialogue in society about how best to tackle the global issue.

== Work ==
The stated aim of CAFOD is to tackle poverty globally. Through local Catholic Church and secular partners, its aims to help people directly in their own communities and campaigns for global justice

=== International programmes ===
In 2023, CAFOD implemented programmes in 42 countries located in Africa, Asia, Europe, the Middle East, Latin America and the Caribbean. CAFOD is not a direct implementer but works according to the localisation principle, i.e. through local partner organisations such as Caritas Marsabit, a diocesan partner in northern Kenya, and Action on Disability and Development in Bangladesh.

CAFOD supported local partners organisations with 594 grants and programme payments worth £41.8 million in 2023, reaching one million vulnerable and excluded people directly.

=== Campaigns ===
CAFOD has organised many campaigns over the years and participated in joint campaigns with other charities. These campaigns tackled a series of topics, for example the impact of debt crises in the poorest nations ("Jubilee 2000", "Cancel the Debt", "Stop Cowboy Lenders", "The New Debt Crisis"), the right of small-scale farmers around the world to use their seeds, and the negative impact of powerful agribusiness companies ("Fix the Food System", launched in 2022). Other campaigns have demanded climate action ("The Time is Now"; "One Climate, One World"), renewable energy for the world's poorest people ("Power to Be"), or raised awareness against the UK Illegal Migration Act 2023 ("Build Bridges not Walls").

CAFOD supports and administers the process whereby Catholic communities (churches, schools, religious orders and chaplaincies) can apply for the Livesimply award, through which communities can record, celebrate and develop their approach to living simply, in solidarity with people in poverty and sustainably with creation. As of February 2024, 100 schools had been awarded LiveSimply recognition. Participation in CAFOD's LiveSimply programme has been commended by the Catholic Bishops of England and Wales.

== Structure and funding ==
In 2023, CAFOD employed 391 staff and in addition worked with more than 3,000 volunteers carrying out a range of roles such as campaigning, fundraising, media, office support and youth work.

CAFOD is funded by the Catholic community in England and Wales, the British government (through UK aid), private and institutional donors, and the general public.

In 2019/20, CAFOD's income was £45million. A few years later, in 2022/2023, the total revenue had increased to £67,916,000, £37 million of which was raised by 1,856 parishes in England and over 78,000 individuals, 1,043 schools and over 1,000 organisations. In addition, the organisation received over £11 million from legacies, raised around £5.5 million to respond to humanitarian emergencies in East Africa, Ukraine, Pakistan, Turkey and Syria, and obtained £16 million from the Disasters Emergency Committee.

In order to raise awareness and funds, CAFOD has been working with "celebraty embassadors", including TV presenter Julie Etchingham, actor David Harewood, actress Jo Joyner, TV and radio presenter Dermot O'Leary, actor and director Ben Price, actress Emma Rigby, cook and television presenter Delia Smith, and composer Benson Taylor.

CAFOD's magazine, Side by Side, is published quarterly.
