= People In Aid =

Defunct international charity

- Successor: CHS Alliance
- Founded: 1995
- Dissolved: 2015
- Type: Non-governmental organization
- Purpose: Human Resources, International Development
- Location: London, England
- Region served: Worldwide
- Method: Training, Research, Innovation, People In Aid Code
- Executive Director: Jonathan Potter
- Website: chsalliance.org

People In Aid was an international, not-for-profit membership organisation with offices in the UK, Australia and East Africa. People In Aid no longer exists following its merger with HAP International on 9 June 2015 to form the CHS Alliance.

People In Aid's aim was to improve organisational effectiveness in the humanitarian and development sector worldwide by advocating, supporting and recognising good practice in the management of people. People In Aid implemented this vision through use of the People In Aid Code which outlined seven principles for effective people management.

The last executive director of People In Aid was Jonathan Potter.

== History ==
Established by agencies in the humanitarian and development sector in 1995, People In Aid grew from a small membership organisation into a global resource for NGOs. People In Aid maintained a focus on the quality of human resources and people management in the relief and development sector.

=== 1995 ===
A research report published in 1995 called Room for Improvement had found weaknesses in existing practice in humanitarian and development organisations which led to 'poor performance by staff, so diminishing the quality of programmes'. The agencies which had initiated the research, including the British government's Overseas Development Administration (now DFID), established an inter-agency project, hired a coordinator and recruited a steering group representing 12 organisations.

=== 1997 ===
The People In Aid Code of Best Practice in the Management and Support of Aid Personnel was published, and agencies began a 3-year pilot implementation of the Code. The debate about quality and accountability in the sector led to development not only of a complete framework intended to prompt improvements in practice (the Code) but an evaluative mechanism for agencies to use in checking their progress and reporting on it.

=== 1999 ===
People In Aid was formally established to support agencies wishing to enhance human resource management through use of the Code and became a UK registered charity.

=== 2001 ===
Seven agencies implemented the People In Aid Code and published their findings in 'Ahead of the Field' (2001). They were:

- British Red Cross
- Concern Worldwide
- Health Unlimited
- International Health Exchange (now merged with RedR)
- Mission Aviation Fellowship (Europe)
- RedR and Tearfund

Subsequently, People In Aid focused on providing the information it believed agencies needed to improve their quality of human resource management. Its output expanded and included workshops, handbooks, affinity groups, template policies, research and information notes.

=== 2003 ===
The Code was revised in 2003, based on feedback, and became known as the Code of Good Practice with the intention of reflecting the cultural diversity and differing approaches of agencies within the sector. The centrality of staff, both local and international, in delivering humanitarian and development missions effectively became a priority for the organisation in its last ten years. Evaluations of agency work still pointed to deficiencies in a broad range of human resources activities.

=== 2012 ===
In 2012 People in Aid collaborated with Humanitarian Accountability Partnership International and The Sphere Project to develop the website JointStandards.org in response to the needs of humanitarian agency staff to have easy worldwide access to information on humanitarian standards. The site used very low bandwidth so that it could be accessed easily by those working in areas of low connectivity.

== The People In Aid Code of Good Practice ==
The People In Aid Code of Good Practice was a management tool for humanitarian and development agencies. Its aim was to help agencies enhance the quality of their human resource management. Responding to a need recognised by a diverse group of NGOs in the early to mid-1990s, the Code was a contributor to the humanitarian and development sector's efforts to improve quality, effectiveness and accountability in NGOs, both international and national.

The Code was intended to reflect the belief that staff were the key to delivering effective programmes and responding to the needs of many millions of people throughout the world. People In Aid believed the Code provided a comprehensive and sector-specific framework which encapsulated much of what an NGO needed to think about when seeking to enhance the quality of its human resource management.

Once an agency had become a member of People In Aid, it was offered an opportunity to work towards achieving People In Aid Certification. The two-tiered implementation process certified an organisation as "Committed" (Quality Mark 1) or "Verified Compliant" (Quality Mark 2) to the People In Aid Code of Good Practice.

The Code comprised Seven Principles:

- Human Resources Strategy
- Staff Policies and Practices
- Managing People
- Consultation and Communication
- Recruitment and Selection
- Learning, Training and Development
- Health, Safety and Security

Quality Mark 2: Verified Compliant

Quality Mark 2 was awarded to organisations which implemented the People In Aid Code of Good Practice and provided assurance that reliable management and information systems were in place through a process of external social audit.

List of organisations Verified Compliant with the People In Aid Code of Good Practice:

- British Red Cross, UK
- CAFOD, UK
- CONCERN Worldwide, Ireland
- International Aid Services, Sweden
- Islamic Relief Deutschland, Germany
- Leprosy Mission International, UK
- Mission Aviation Fellowship International
- Mission East, Belgium
- People In Aid, UK
- RedR, UK
- Save the Children UK
- Tearfund, UK
- Womankind Worldwide, UK
- World Vision, UK

Quality Mark 1: Committed

This was the first certification level that a member organisation could achieve with People In Aid. It was awarded when an organisation could demonstrate that it was committed to continual improvement of people management practice.

Through HR self-audit and engagement with stakeholders, the organisation was expected to identify strategic areas for improvement. This process was supported by People In Aid which provided guidance material including an HR Audit Toolkit, HR Manuals and an already tailored Employee Survey.

This initial level was a step towards gaining full recognition of the Code of Good Practice and the second Quality Mark.

List of organisations Committed to the People In Aid Code of Good Practice:

- Agency for Co-operation and Research in Development, Kenya
- CESVI, Italy
- Christian Aid, UK
- HAP International, Switzerland
- HIJRA Somalia, Kenya
- Islamic Relief Worldwide, UK
- Mission Aviation Fellowship International, UK
- Medical Emergency Relief International, UK
- Oxfam Australia, Australia
- Sierra Leone Red Cross Society, Sierra Leone
- Sightsavers International, UK
- TEAR Australia, Australia
- The Brooke, UK
- Viva Network, UK

== People In Aid Membership ==
Membership of People In Aid was a way to access people management information. People In Aid offered membership in order to help organisations and their managers save time and work more effectively.

== People In Aid's Work ==
People In Aid's activities were designed to complement strategic priorities and included:

=== Events ===
People In Aid offered workshops and learning platforms in order to help keep HR staff and managers abreast of current standards, trends and emerging issues. People In Aid also set up networks intended for member organisations to learn and share experience on topics such as Health & Safety and reward.

=== Networking ===
People In Aid promoted engagement with a global community of peers both virtually and through events. On its website it provided support for groups on specialist subjects, intended for idea-sharing on HR challenges in the humanitarian and development sector.

=== Support Services ===
People In Aid asserted that humanitarian and development organisations which invested in better policies and procedures would see a return on investment through increased staff retention and job satisfaction.

=== Resources ===
People In Aid provided resources including handbooks, policies and resource sheets in order to help organisations guide and improve HR strategy. Through collaborative partnerships with academic institutions, People In Aid produced a variety of research reports.
