= Humanitarian Accountability Partnership International =

International non-profit organisation

- Successor: CHS Alliance
- Formation: 2003
- Dissolved: 2015
- Legal status: Non-profit organisation
- Headquarters: Geneva, Switzerland
- Website: www.hapinternational.org

Humanitarian Accountability Partnership International (HAP International), established in 2003, was the humanitarian sector's first international self-regulatory body. A multi-agency initiative working to improve the accountability of humanitarian action to people affected by disasters and other crises, HAP members ranged from organisations with a mandate for emergency relief and development activities to institutional donors. The organisation aimed to strengthen accountability towards those affected by crisis situations and to facilitate improved performance within the humanitarian sector. The ultimate goal of the organisation was to uphold the rights and the dignity of crisis-affected populations across the world.

HAP International merged with People In Aid on 9 June 2015 to form the CHS Alliance and no longer exists.

== Humanitarian accountability ==
HAP International, along with other quality and accountability initiatives, has been pivotal in defining the concept of "humanitarian accountability", which has been much debated by the international humanitarian community. The definition of "accountability" in a general sense is the responsible use of power, while "accountability in humanitarian situations" ensures that the power to help in situations of conflict and disaster is exercised responsibly. When implemented, it means that survivors of war or disaster are able to influence decisions about the help they receive and can give feedback and complain if they feel the 'helping power' was not exercised well."

=== Commendation by the British Minister for International Development ===
On the 7th of October 2008 during a UNHCR Executive Committee meeting, the British Minister for International Development, Gareth Thomas, highlighted the achievements being made across the sector and commended all humanitarian agencies for the vital role they play in saving lives and assisting the world's most vulnerable. The minister added, however, "I also want to challenge anyone who thinks the task of reform is complete. It isn't. Yes – we have come a long way. But we have much further to go." He went on to say that there were, in his view, five "key elements essential for improving the international humanitarian response", including greater accountability. He argued, "Agencies urgently need to put in place standardised monitoring arrangements. And where accountability mechanisms already exist – such as the Humanitarian Accountability Partnership International – we must use them more systematically."

=== Importance of accountability ===
The unique nature of humanitarian work makes accountability particularly important for the following reasons:

Acute needs People who have survived conflict or a natural disaster often have acute needs. Frequently, they have been displaced from their homes and lack their usual economic, social or psychological support systems.

Lack of choice, lack of competition Normally, recipients of humanitarian aid cannot 'choose' between relief providers. So they cannot signal they are unhappy with a service by going to another provider, unlike consumers in competitive retail markets.

Lack of voice Disaster survivors usually lack access to formal procedures for participation in decisions about assistance. Traditional governance structures are likely to be extremely strained by the disaster or conflict, if they have survived at all, and (until recently) relief agencies did not include participation and complaints systems in their programmes.

Donor-survivor disconnect Moreover, the people whose choices do influence relief organisations – donor governments and their citizens – are not recipients of humanitarian aid. Therefore, they may not be in a good position to judge whether the aid was appropriate or not.

Life and death decisions Finally, in humanitarian situations the consequences of decisions can be particularly severe. For example, a person's decision to queue for food distribution (rather than forage or seek help through private networks) may be a gamble with life or death if the organisation has underestimated the amount of food needed to go around.

=== Humanitarian Accountability Report ===
The Humanitarian Accountability Report, an annual report published by HAP International, reviewed the progress made towards strengthening accountability norms and practices in the humanitarian sector. The report also provided detailed findings of the annual "Perceptions of Accountability in Humanitarian Action" survey. The annual Secretariat Report, published by HAP International, was the organisation's self-assessment of progress made against its annual work plan, and included accountability reports by HAP members.

== Aims and activities ==
HAP International developed the "HAP Standard in Accountability and Quality Management", a tool to help organisations design, implement, assess, improve and recognise accountable programmes. Being accountable to crisis-affected communities helps organisations develop quality programmes that meet those people's needs, and reduces the possibility of mistakes, abuse (including sexual exploitation and abuse by aid workers) and corruption. The 2010 HAP Standard is the result of an extensive review process that involved wide consultation with different stakeholders, including crisis-affected communities, aid workers and donors.

HAP's strategic value proposition was that quality, accountability and programme results are inextricably linked. By improving agency accountability in a systematic way, programme quality, impact and outcomes would also be enhanced. The essential tools for driving this virtual circle were the application of a programme quality management system (designed in accordance with the HAP Standard), reinforced through shared learning and independent auditing. To these ends HAP International offered a range of training workshops and audit services (members can be officially certified by HAP). All stakeholders, including the people an organisation aims to assist, crisis-affected communities, donors and the humanitarian organisations themselves, made measurable gains as a consequence of the work undertaken by the Partnership.

The objectives of HAP International were:

- to develop and maintain the HAP Standard through research, consultation, and collaboration;
- to support members and potential members of HAP International in applying the HAP Standard by providing training and advice;
- to communicate, advocate, promote, and report on the HAP Standard;
- to monitor and report on the implementation of the HAP Standard and to certify its members accordingly; and
- to assist members in finding solutions where concerns or complaints are raised about them.

HAP International's work was based on the findings of the Humanitarian Accountability Project, a 2001 inter-agency action research initiative, as well as the Joint Evaluation of the International Response to the Genocide in Rwanda.

== HAP Standard ==
The HAP Standard is a practical and measurable tool that represents a broad consensus of what matters most in humanitarian action. The Standard helps organisations design, implement, assess, improve and recognise accountable programmes. Being accountable to crisis-affected communities helps organisations to develop quality programmes that meet those people's needs, and reduces the possibility of mistakes, abuse (including sexual exploitation and abuse) and corruption.

The 2010 edition of the HAP Standard in Accountability and Quality Management is the result of an extensive review process of the 2007 Standard that involved wide consultation with different stakeholders, including crisis-affected communities, aid workers and donors. Over 1,900 people in 56 countries contributed to the review process and the preparation of the 2010 edition, bringing to the process authentic experiences from different perspectives.

The HAP Standard is a quality assurance tool for humanitarian organisations. By comparing an organisation's processes, policies and products to the Standard's six benchmarks, it is possible to measure how well the organisation assures accountability and quality in its humanitarian work. Organisations that comply with the Standard:

- declare their commitment to HAP's seven Principles of Accountability and to their own Humanitarian Accountability Framework (a set of definitions, procedures and standards that specify how an agency will ensure accountability to its stakeholders);
- develop and implement a Humanitarian Quality Management System;
- provide key information about quality management to key stakeholders;
- enable beneficiaries and their representatives to participate in programme decisions and give their informed consent;
- determine the competencies and development needs of staff;
- establish and implement a complaints-handling procedure;
- establish a process of continual improvement.

== Sexual exploitation and abuse ==
Sexual exploitation and abuse (SEA) by humanitarian staff is the most egregious result when organisations fail to be accountable to beneficiaries of humanitarian aid. In an emergency where victims have lost everything, women and girls are particularly vulnerable. The Building Safer Organisations project, which aims to develop the capacity of NGOs "to receive and investigate allegations of sexual exploitation and abuse brought by persons of concern—including refugees, displaced persons and local host populations" relocated from ICVA to HAP in 2007, and its lessons and materials were subsequently integrated into HAP's "Building Safer Organisations – Investigation Learning Programme" training.

In June 2008 HAP published a report examining the issues related to lodging complaints by beneficiaries of humanitarian aid.

== Certification scheme ==
HAP's certification scheme aimed to provide assurance that certified agencies were managing the quality of their humanitarian actions in accordance with the HAP Standard. In practical terms, a HAP certification meant providing external auditors with access to the organisation's mission statement, accounts and control systems, allowing greater transparency in operations and overall accountability.

To achieve HAP certification an organisation had to be examined and tested through a formal third party independent system against the benchmarks and requirements of the HAP Standard.

The certification audit process included:

1. Review of head office and field site documents.
2. Interviewing of head office and field site staff, partners and disaster survivors.
3. Direct observation of good practice as specified in the agency's Humanitarian Accountability Framework.

HAP certification allowed agencies to demonstrate their achievements in accountability and quality management in a process developed and recognised by humanitarian peers. It was a voluntary commitment of the centrality of beneficiaries to an organisation's humanitarian work.

== Membership ==
At the time of its merger with People In Aid, HAP International had 100 member organisations. The membership included 79 full members and 21 associate members ranging from organisations with a mandate for emergency relief and development activities to institutional donors.

== Donors ==
The work of HAP was supported by AusAID (Australia), Bureau of Population, Refugees, and Migration (US), DANIDA (Denmark), Irish Aid, Netherlands Ministry of Foreign Affairs, Oak Foundation (Switzerland), SIDA (Sweden) and SDC (Switzerland).

In the past, HAP had been supported by the following:

2003: AusAID (Australia), DANIDA (Denmark), Ford Foundation (US), Netherlands Ministry of Foreign Affairs, Norwegian Ministry of Foreign Affairs, SIDA (Sweden)

2004: AusAID (Australia), DANIDA (Denmark), Ford Foundation (US), Netherlands Ministry of Foreign Affairs, Norwegian Ministry of Foreign Affairs, SIDA (Sweden)

2005: AusAID (Australia), DANIDA (Denmark), Ford Foundation (US), Netherlands Ministry of Foreign Affairs, Norwegian Ministry of Foreign Affairs, SIDA (Sweden)

2006: ACIFID (Australia), AusAID (Australia), CARE International, DANIDA (Denmark), Ford Foundation (US), Irish Aid, Netherlands Ministry of Foreign Affairs, Norwegian Ministry of Foreign Affairs, Oxfam UK, SDC (Switzerland), SIDA (Sweden), World Vision

2007: AusAID (Australia), BPRM (US), DFID (UK), DANIDA (Denmark), Ford Foundation (US), Irish Aid, Netherlands Ministry of Foreign Affairs, Norwegian Ministry of Foreign Affairs, Oak Foundation (Switzerland), OFDA (US), SIDA (Sweden)

2008: BPRM (US), DFID (UK), DANIDA (Denmark), Ford Foundation (US), Irish Aid, Netherlands Ministry of Foreign Affairs, Norwegian Ministry of Foreign Affairs, Oak Foundation (Switzerland), SIDA (Sweden)

2009: BPRM (US), DFID (UK), DANIDA (Denmark), ECHO (EU), Ford Foundation (US), Irish Aid, Netherlands Ministry of Foreign Affairs, Norwegian Ministry of Foreign Affairs, SIDA (Sweden)

2010: BPRM (US), DFID (UK), DANIDA (Denmark), ECHO (EU), Irish Aid, Netherlands Ministry of Foreign Affairs, Norwegian Ministry of Foreign Affairs

2011: BPRM (US), DFID (UK), DANIDA (Denmark), Irish Aid, Netherlands Ministry of Foreign Affairs, Oak Foundation (Switzerland)

2012: AusAID (Australia), BPRM (US), DANIDA (Denmark), Irish Aid, Netherlands Ministry of Foreign Affairs, Oak Foundation (Switzerland), SDC (Switzerland), SIDA (Sweden)

== Quality and accountability initiatives ==
The humanitarian community has initiated a number of inter-agency initiatives to improve accountability, quality and performance in humanitarian responses. The four most widely known initiatives are ALNAP (Active Learning Network for Accountability and performance in Humanitarian Action), People In Aid, Sphere Project and HAP International. A move towards greater coherence started in 2006 with the creation of the Quality and Accountability Initiatives Complementarities Group, which included ALNAP, Coordination Sud, Emergency Capacity Building (ECB) Project, Groupe URD, HAP International, People In Aid, and the Sphere Project. Over the years, the group grew with Communicating with Disaster Affected Communities (CDAC), Listening Project, and Disasters Emergency Committee joining.

Moreover, the three organisations HAP International, People In Aid and the Sphere Project started the Joint Standards Initiative (JSI). The JSI was a collaboration building on the strengths of each initiative. In mid-2011, the three initiatives made a joint commitment to promote convergence of their respective standards. Greater coherence should strengthen aid workers' ability to put these standards into practice around the world. The ultimate aim was to improve the quality of humanitarian action for affected communities.

The JSI process led to the publication of the Core Humanitarian Standard on Quality and Accountability in 2014 and the creation of the CHS Alliance in 2015.
