= Steering Committee for Humanitarian Response =

The Steering Committee for Humanitarian Response (SCHR) is an alliance made up of chief executive officers representing nine humanitarian networks or agencies (CARE International, Caritas Internationalis, the International Committee of the Red Cross, the International Federation of Red Cross and Red Crescent Societies, International Save the Children Alliance, Lutheran World Federation, Oxfam, ACT Alliance, and World Vision International).

== Background ==
The SCHR was created in 1972 to improve cooperation among humanitarian agencies involved in disaster assistance. The five founding agencies were Oxfam, the League of Red Cross and Red Crescent Societies (later to become the International Federation of Red Cross and Red Crescent Societies), the World Council of Churches (WCC), the Lutheran World Federation, and Catholic Relief Services (CRS). In 1983, Caritas Internationalis took over the seat held by CRS, and the International Save the Children Alliance joined in 1992. Care International and Médecins sans frontières (MSF) were added in 1997 and the International Committee of the Red Cross in 1999. In January 2007, MSF decided not to renew its membership, leaving the SCHR. The most recent new member is World Vision International which joined in July 2008. The ACT Alliance now represents the WCC. Andrew Morley, the World Vision International President and Chief Executive Officer is the current Chair of the SCHR.

All of its members are internationally focussed and involved in humanitarian emergency assistance. The SCHR was the founder of the Code of Conduct for the International Red Cross and Red Crescent Movement and NGOs in Disaster Relief and its members are all signatories to the code.

== Implementing humanitarian assistance ==
The SCHR agencies implement most of international humanitarian assistance either directly or as operational partners with intergovernmental humanitarian agencies such as the UNHCR or the WFP. An important role of the SCHR is to introduce the field experience of its members into humanitarian decision making process of the United Nations, particularly through the UN's Inter-agency Standing Committee (IASC) which is made up of the heads of the principle UN agencies involved in humanitarian assistance.

== Standards ==
In addition to drawing up the Red Cross and NGO Code of Conduct for Disaster Response, the SCHR, together with the US based NGO consortium, InterAction, set up the Sphere Project in 1997 to develop minimum standards for humanitarian assistance in four major sectors, water and sanitation, food, shelter, and health, as well as framing a humanitarian charter for disaster response.

== Peer reviews ==
In 2003, the SCHR embarked on an internal peer review process. In order to improve accountability, the members agreed to process for reviewing each other on important issues related to humanitarian response. The first issue examined was the prevention of sexual exploitation and abuse by member agencies in their work.

== Issues ==
Some of the most important issues addressed by the SCHR have included: land mines, international sanctions, humanitarian coordination, the promotion of humanitarian principles, relations with military actors in a complex emergency, humanitarian access, internally displaced people, humanitarian impact of small arms, field security coordination, international protection, and the relationship between humanitarian assistance and human rights.
