= Consortium of British Humanitarian Agencies =

The Consortium of British Humanitarian Agencies (CBHA) consists of 15 UK based NGOs - ActionAid, Action Against Hunger, CARE International UK, CAFOD, Christian Aid, Concern Worldwide UK, Helpage International, International Rescue Committee, Islamic Relief Worldwide, Merlin, Oxfam GB, Plan International UK, Save the Children UK, Tearfund and World Vision UK. The consortium was officially established in 2010.

The main purpose of the consortium is to promote collaboration amongst NGOs in order to deliver more effective humanitarian relief in the immediate aftermath of a disaster.

The consortium is implementing a 2-year project, funded by the UK government’s Department for International Development (DFID). This project consists of the following components:

- creating an emergency response fund to provide predictable funds in the first 48 hours of an emergency so that agencies will have the resources and capacity to deliver emergency assistance in the immediate aftermath of a disaster or other crisis, in advance of other emergency funding becoming available.
- running capacity building initiatives to increase the numbers and competencies of leaders within the sector at both national and international level.
- increasing the available human resource surge capacity to respond quickly and effectively to emergencies
- strengthening humanitarian supply chain logistics systems to improve the efficiency of tracking the storage, transport and distribution of relief items.
- establishing a system to collate and disseminate key lessons and good practice and integrate learning and evaluations into future strategic planning of the CBHA
