= CALP Network =

Nonprofit humanitarian organisation

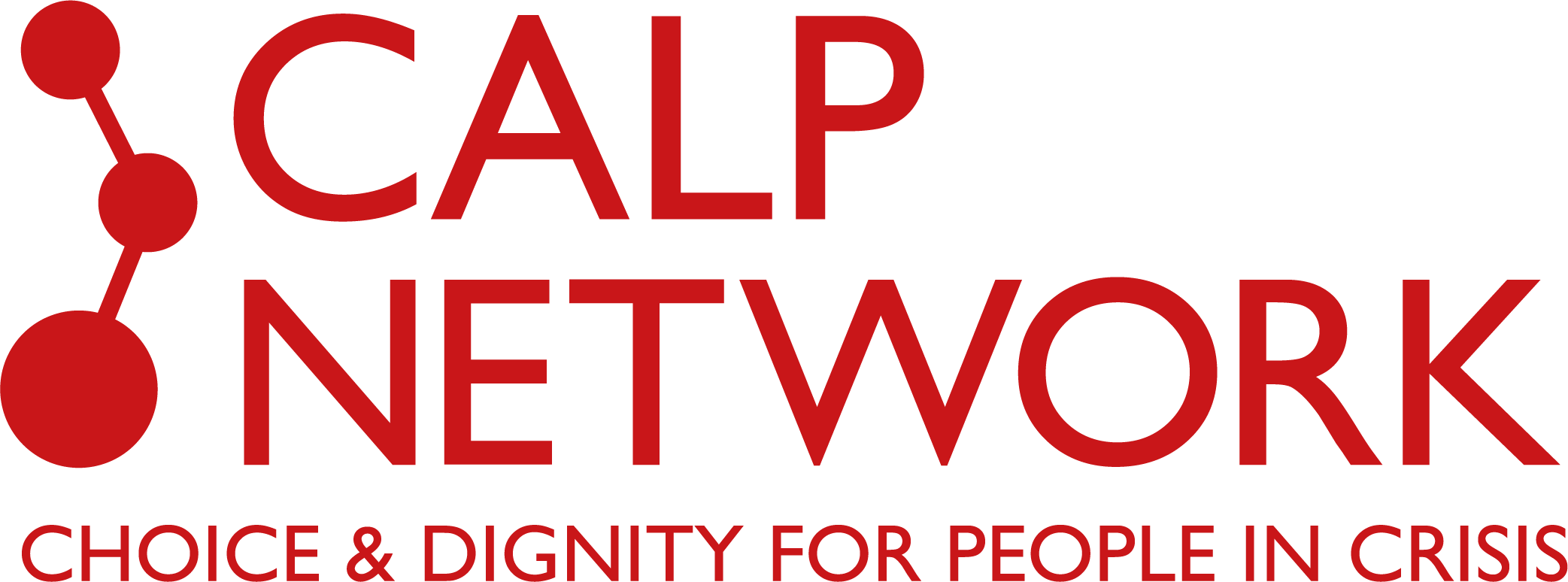
- Formation: 2009
- Type: Supporting the adoption of Cash and Voucher Assistance
- Region served: Worldwide
- Website: www.calpnetwork.org

The CALP Network is an organisation originating in 2005 and officially launched in 2009 as The Cash Learning Partnership, with the objectives of increasing the scale and quality of Cash and Voucher Assistance (CVA) employed by humanitarian agencies around the world to deliver aid. CVA encompasses aid delivered as cash (as physical currency or e-cash), or vouchers exchangeable for goods and services, directly to recipients, and represents an increasingly significant aid modality amounting to 21% of total international humanitarian assistance expenditure in 2022. CALP works to build CVA capacity within aid organisations, especially by providing training and e-learning; coordinates the use of CVA by agencies; compiles and shares knowledge and research; and contributes to the development of policy environments encompassing CVA.

CALP members include national and international non-governmental organisations (NGOs), United Nations agencies, the Red Cross/Crescent Movement, donors, specialist social innovation, technology and financial services companies, researchers and academics, and individual practitioners.

CALP uses evidence to promote better humanitarian action and supports change through training, learning and policy engagement. Among others, CALP is known for the production of periodical State of the World's Cash reports, most recently in 2023.

== History ==
The CALP Network originated in the Overseas Development Institute Humanitarian Policy Group Tsunami Cash Learning Project, convened in 2005 after the 2004 Indian Ocean earthquake and tsunami and involving five humanitarian organisations – the British Red Cross Society, Concern Worldwide, Mercy Corps, Oxfam GB, and Save the Children UK – interested in sharing lessons arising out of the use of cash support in the Tsunami's aftermath and with a view to supporting capacity building and developing training material; conducting research and gathering evidence; and advocating for coordination, contingency planning, and preparedness to encourage the appropriate use of CVA.

The partnership was formalised in 2008–2009 as the Global Learning Partnership in Cash-based Responses in Humanitarian Responses (later shortened to The Cash Learning Partnership, as known until November 2021) by founding members Save the Children UK, the British Red Cross Society, and Oxfam GB. Action Against Hunger, and the Norwegian Refugee Council were invited to join later. The newly founded organisation received an initial £150,000 funding from the EU Directorate-General for European Civil Protection and Humanitarian Aid Operations (EU ECHO); Oxfam, NRC and AAH hosted a dedicated CALP staff team. From 2010, with new funding from Visa Inc. and additional funds from EU ECHO, it built a team of coordination, communication and country-level (from 2012 regional-level) focal point staff.

== Activities ==
CALP undertakes original research, and acts as a forum for the sharing of the knowledge and research of Cash and Voucher Assistance (CVA). As well as the production of thematic resources arising from research, CALP produces periodic "State of the World's Cash" reports providing a comprehensive view of CVA, and setting out recommendations for the near term. The 2018 report found that CVA was used to disburse US$2.8bn in humanitarian assistance, an increase of 40% from 2015 and 100% from 2014. CALP also works to promote research by members and others in the wider networks in the field, such as a year-long study funded by Concern Worldwide, Cash transfers in humanitarian programmes: assessing cost-efficiency. Research reports are disseminated through CALP's open access web library.

CALP has, since 2011, maintained a public-facing glossary of cash transfers related terms, the purpose of which is to define and harmonise terminology used within the CVA community to encourage common understanding.

CALP provides traditional and self-directed training covering the fundamentals and core skills necessary to assess and deliver CVA. It also maintains a library of tools, reports, guidance and research related to CVA.

CALP's policy building work extends to involvement in the production of key policy documents of the UK, European Union and OECD. CALP contributed research sponsored by the European Commission's Humanitarian Aid department (ECHO) and the UK Department for International Development (DFID) resulting in the publication of Is Cash Transfer Programming 'Fit for the Future'?, a January 2014 report by the Humanitarian Futures Programme, King's College London, examining how changes in the broader global and humanitarian landscape may evolve, influence and shape CTP's future progression. CALP acted as advisors in the production of Cash Based Response, an OECD Commitments into Practice series publication. CALP partnered with EU ECHO on a "Tracking Cash and Voucher Assistance (CVA)" workstream from 2016–2020, arising as a sub-stream of the World Humanitarian Summit Grand Bargain Cash workstream, resulting in the publication of Tracking Cash and Voucher Assistance Agreements – Recommendations and Minimum Requirements from the Grand Bargain Cash Workstream.

With support from CALP Network, CVA was fully integrated into the revision of Sphere Standards in 2018. This marked a significant change from the 2011 Sphere Standards where CVA existed under the Food Security and Nutrition section. 2016 also marked a significant moment as CALP's Minimum Standard for Market Analysis was published and achieved the status of Sphere companion.

In 2023 CALP published The State of the World's Cash that includes recommendation about use of cash and voucher assistance in humanitarian aid.

In 2024 CALP published an online "Cash 101" resource answering all the commonly asked questions around humanitarian cash and voucher assistance.

== Organisation ==
The CALP Network is global network of organisations engaged in policy, practice and research in humanitarian cash and voucher assistance (CVA) and financial assistance more broadly. Members currently include local and international non-governmental organisations, United Nations agencies, the Red Cross/Crescent Movement, donors, specialist social innovation, technology and financial services companies, researchers and academics, and individual practitioners. It has a staff team distributed through West Africa, East Africa, the Middle East, North America, and Europe.

The CALP Board and Technical Advisory Group is drawn from its membership.

In 2023, the Board comprised members from:

- Action Against Hunger
- CARE International
- International Federation of Red Cross and Red Crescent Societies
- GiveDirectly
- GSMA
- Muslim Hands
- Norwegian Refugee Council
- Oxfam International
- Plan International
- United Nations Children's Fund

CALP is currently funded by the following donors:

- German Federal Foreign Office (GFFO)
- Norwegian Ministry of Foreign Affairs (NMFA)
- Swedish International Development Cooperation Agency (Sida)
- Swiss Agency for Development and Cooperation (SDC)
- United States Agency for International Development (USAID)

CALP’s work is the responsibility of CALP and does not necessarily reflect the views of its donors.
