= Andrew Morey =

New Zealand cricketer

Personal information
- Full name: Henry Andrew Thomas Morey
- Born: 1 July 1854; Gravesend, Kent, England
- Died: 30 July 1926 (aged 70); Parua Bay, Whangerei, New Zealand

Domestic team information
- Years: Team
- 1888/89: Wellington
- Source: Cricinfo, 27 October 2020

Henry Andrew Thomas Morey (1 July 1854 – 30 July 1926) was a New Zealand cricketer. He played in one first-class match for Wellington during the 1888–89 season.

Born at Gravesend in Kent, Morey's family migrated to New Zealand when he was about 12. He farmed cattle at Parua Bay in Whangarei District to the north of Auckland. He served on the Road Board, Whangarei County Council, the board of Whangarei Hospital and was chairman of Whangarei Harbour Board.

In his only first-class innings, Morey scored 11 runs against Nelson at the Basin Reserve.

Morey died at Parua Bay in 1926 after an illness.
