= The SEEP Network =

- Founded: 1985
- Type: Non-profit organization
- Purpose: Economic Development; Financial Inclusion; Market Systems Development; Market Resilience; Women’s Economic Empowerment; Savings Groups; Consumer Protection
- Location: Arlington, Virginia, United States
- Employees: ~ 15 (2019)
- Website: seepnetwork.org

The SEEP Network, also known as SEEP, is a member-based, nonprofit organization with headquarters in Arlington, Virginia.

== Background ==
In 1985, a group of U.S. based NGOs pioneered new strategies for enterprise development and microcredit, seeking to promote economic opportunities for the world's poor. With support from USAID's Office of Private and Voluntary Cooperation, they formed the “Small Enterprise Evaluation Project” (SEEP) to champion the importance of impact assessments and develop evaluation methods that would inform practice.

== Membership ==
SEEP members represent a diverse mix of over 100 organizations active in 150 countries in Africa, Latin America, Asia, and the Middle East. Members include international development organizations and consulting firms; relief and humanitarian aid organizations; research, monitoring and results measurement agencies; and microfinance associations.

== Thematic Areas ==
SEEP's work in the economic development sector is focused on five thematic areas with a variety of initiatives within each :

=== Agriculture & Food Security ===
This involves improving the productivity and resilience of small scale farmers is essential to address poverty and hunger worldwide. Projects in this area include:

- Resource Library

=== Resilient Markets ===
Programming in this area enables market systems to build long-term resilience increases household and community capacity to prepare, cope, and recover from disasters. Programs and activities include:

- Minimum Economic Recovery Standards, internationally recognized consensus on best practices for building economic resilience for crisis-affected communities.
- Markets in Crises Community of Practice, a forum for practitioners engaging with markets in emergency and recovery contexts to share ideas, experiences, resources and learning.
- Livelihoods and Inclusive Finance Expansion, a USAID-funded project linking vulnerable entrepreneurs at the bottom of the economic pyramid with business training and financial services and facilitating growth of the microfinance sector in Lebanon.
- Resilient Markets Resource Library

=== Responsible Finance ===
This includes promoting strong local member-based associations to act as champions of transparency and consumer protection leads to more ethical and fair treatment of clients of financial services. Programs and activities include:

- Responsible Finance Through Local Leadership & Learning, a program aimed to catalyze large scale systemic change around responsible finance by addressing the underlying causes of market weaknesses.
- Association Services, a wealth of tools and expertise helping associations accelerate their development, expand and improve their product and service offerings.
- Responsible Finance Resource Library

=== Savings Groups ===
Savings Groups promote financial inclusion and build resilience in marginalized communities. Programs and activities include:

- Savings-Led Working Group, a recognized home for collaborative learning and action among Savings Groups practitioners.
- Savings Groups Evidence & Learning Initiative, a partnership between FSD Africa and The SEEP Network to facilitate the creation, sharing and use of evidence for organizations supporting Savings Groups in Sub-Saharan Africa.
- Mastercard Foundation Savings Learning Lab, a partnership with the Mastercard Foundation, Itad and The SEEP Network advancing learning about financial inclusion.
- The Mango Tree, the global resource on Savings Groups.
- Global Savings Groups Conference

=== Women’s Economic Empowerment ===
This involves supporting women's ability to succeed and advance economically leads to healthy and productive households, growing businesses, and the well-being of communities and nations. Programs and activities include:

- Women's Economic Empowerment Working Group, a diverse group of people committed to advancing women's access to financial services, participation in markets and agency in making economic decisions.
- Peer Learning Group: Shifting Social Norms in the Economy for Women's Economic Empowerment
- AWEF Learning Series, a collaboration with the Arab Women's Enterprise Fund, DAI Europe and MarketShare Associates. The series engages diverse stakeholders to examine practical lessons and solutions in women's economic empowerment.
- Women's Economic Empowerment Resource Library
- WEE Global Learning Forum

== Closure ==
On December 13, 2021, SEEP publicly announced to its members that it would be closing in the next 12-18 months due to financial pressures caused by the ongoing coronavirus pandemic.
