= Cash and Voucher Assistance =

Type of humanitarian aid

In the realm of humanitarian aid, Cash and Voucher Assistance (CVA) is recognized as an umbrella term for two of the common modalities of assistance for delivering swift and flexible humanitarian aid support to populations affected by various crises, the third being in-kind assistance.

- Humanitarian Cash Assistance (also referred to as cash transfers or cash grants) describes assistance provided in the form of money - either physical currency or e-cash* - to recipients (individuals, households, or communities). Cash transfers are unrestricted by definition, which means recipients can choose how to use the assistance. As such, cash is distinct from restricted modalities including vouchers and in-kind assistance. The terms 'cash' or 'cash assistance' should be used when referring specifically to cash transfers only (i.e., 'cash' or 'cash assistance' should not be used to mean 'cash and voucher assistance'). 'Cash' is here applied broadly to include both physical currency and different forms of e-cash/ digital payments, but typically in regular use 'cash' refers only to physical currency (coins, notes).
- Humanitarian Voucher Assistance. describes assistance provided in the form of a paper voucher or e-voucher that can be exchanged for a set value, quantity and/or type of goods or services, denominated either as a currency value (e.g., $15), a predetermined range of commodities (e.g., fruits and vegetables) or specific services (e.g., a medical treatment)), or a combination of value and commodities. Vouchers are restricted by default, although the degree of restriction will vary based on the programme design and type of voucher. They are redeemable with preselected vendors or service providers or in 'fairs' created by the implementing agency.

Together, these methods form the cornerstone of CVA strategies. While they operate differently—with cash transfers providing broad flexibility and vouchers ensuring focused support—both aim to deliver efficient and effective aid that empowers recipients and meets their immediate needs during crises.

According to data reported in 'The State of the World's Cash 2023', which is created by the CALP Network (CALP), there has been an observed increase in the volume of Cash and Voucher Assistance (CVA) in the humanitarian sector. From the year 2020 to 2022, the volume grew from approximately US$6.6 billion to US$10 billion. However, this growth in CVA volume also coincides with an overall increase in humanitarian funding during the same period. When examining CVA as a proportion of total international humanitarian assistance, the increase appears more modest, from 20.3% in 2020 to 20.6% in 2022, which is an incremental rise of 0.3% a figure that CALP assessed could potentially rise to 30–40% if utilized wherever feasible and appropriate.

== Terminology ==
In humanitarian aid, the evolution of terminology has been crucial in clarifying the nature and scope of financial assistance. Initially, terms like 'Cash Transfer Programming' (CTP) and 'Cash Based Assistance' (CBA) were broadly used to encompass both cash transfers and voucher systems. However, this usage often caused confusion, as it didn't distinctly differentiate between the two, despite their differing operational methodologies and impacts.

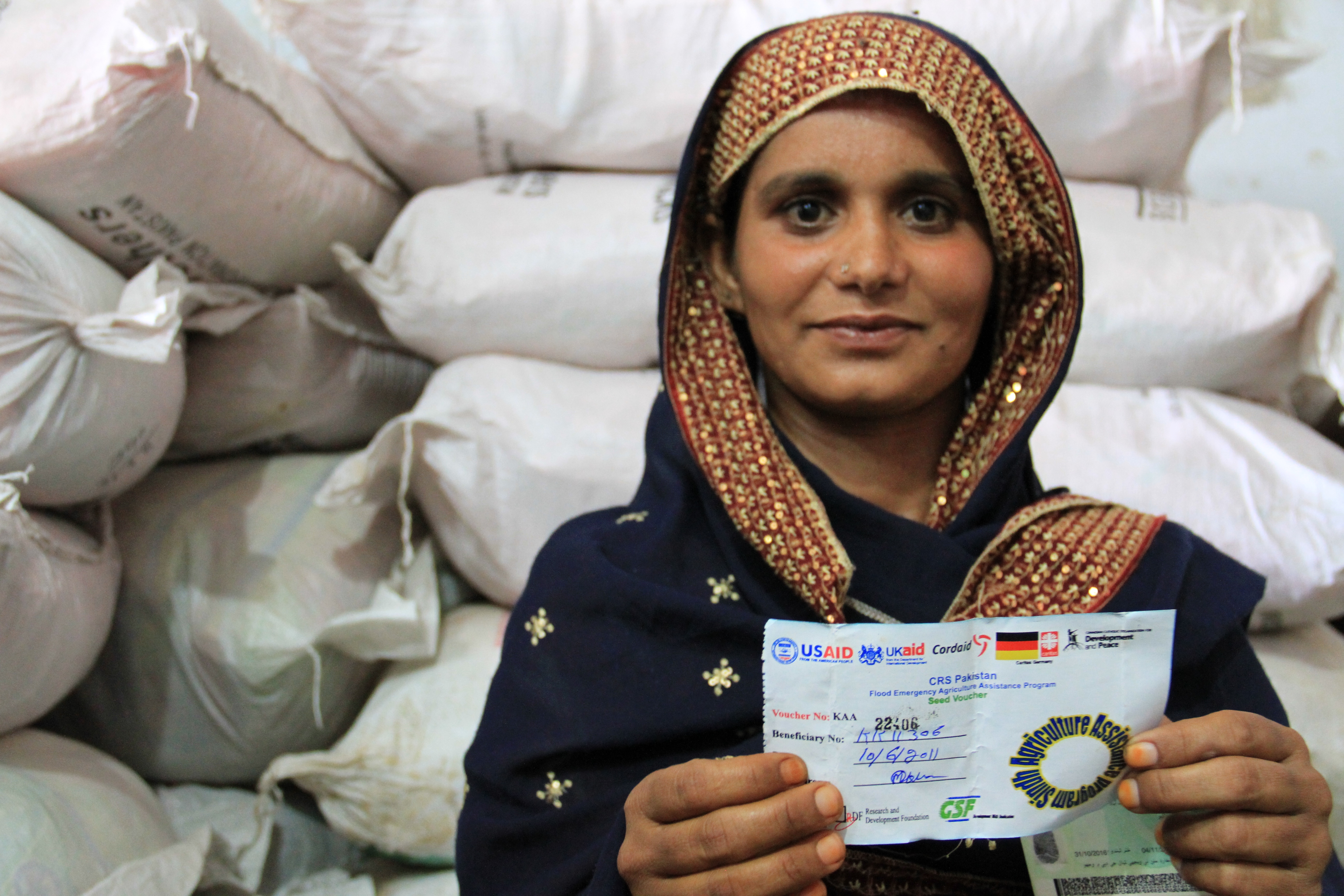
Recipient of an aid voucher exchangable for seeds and fertilizer in Sindh, southern Pakistan, 2011

Cash transfers generally provide recipients with direct financial resources, offering them the autonomy to address their diverse and immediate needs. This modality is valued for its flexibility and broad applicability in various crisis contexts. On the other hand, voucher systems are typically more targeted, allowing recipients to exchange them for specific goods or services. These are often closely aligned with sectoral objectives within humanitarian clusters such as health, WASH (Water, Sanitation, and Hygiene), or shelter, and are tailored to address specific needs in these areas.

Recognizing these differences, the general term was changed to 'Cash and Voucher Assistance' (CVA) post-2018 to more accurately encapsulate both modalities. While humanitarian cash working groups may provide guidance on vouchers in some contexts, it's often different sectoral humanitarian clusters that manage voucher systems due to their sector-specific objectives. This distinction ensures that both cash transfers and vouchers are used effectively to meet the varied needs of affected populations, making humanitarian responses more efficient and targeted.

It is equally important to clarify what falls outside the scope of CVA, as commonly understood in humanitarian terminology. CVA does not encompass financial transactions such as payments to governments, remittances, or microfinance activities. These are separate categories of financial interactions, serving different purposes often related to long-term economic development or structural financial support, rather than direct crisis response.

Additionally, the term CVA is not typically used to describe longer-term economic recovery or development initiatives. This includes livelihood activities such as providing business grants to micro and small enterprises, village grants, or implementing poverty-focused programs. These activities are oriented towards sustainable economic growth and poverty alleviation over a longer term. In common humanitarian terminology, these are distinct from the immediate and direct support characteristic of CVA, which is targeted at addressing the critical needs of individuals and communities in the throes of a crisis.

== History ==
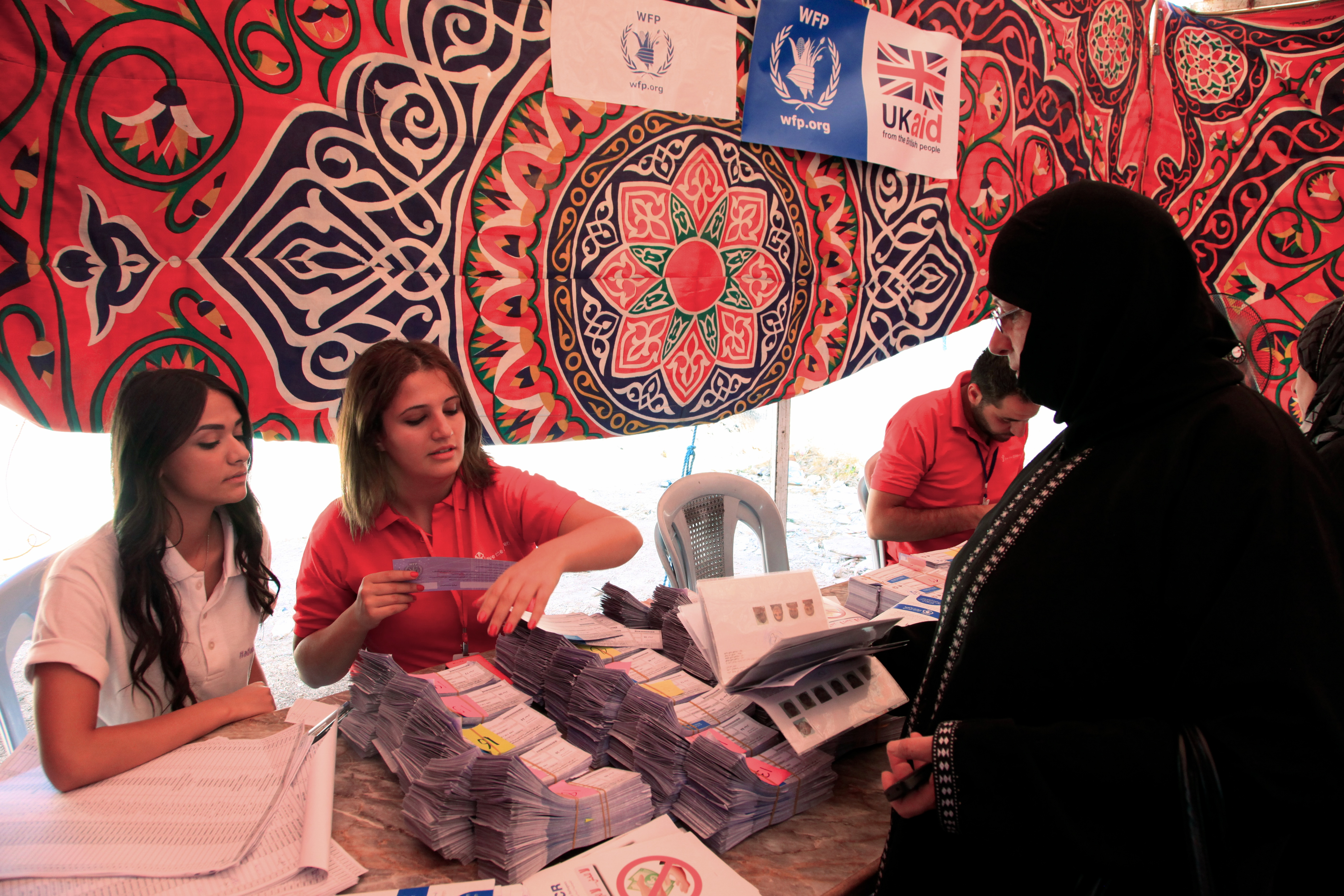
Aid vouchers being issued to Syrian refugees in Jordan, 2013

The provision of aid by the transfer of cash or cash-substitutes is not novel, and can be traced back to at least 100BCE. Conditional Cash Transfers (CCT) have existed within western countries since at least the 17th century, such as the English Poor Laws. However, in international humanitarian aid, the traditional approach to emergency relief has tended to be the provision of in-kind assistance.

Hanlon et al. document a paradigm shift from the early 2000s, away from paternalistic attitudes to aid giving characterised by concerns about regulation and 'good governance', towards direct funding in cash of aid recipients. As with a growth of state-funded CCT in the Global South, the evidence is suggestive of the efficacy of cash transfers to the poor, and the case for such transfers is compelling.

In 2012, Florika Fink-Hooijer introduced cash-based aid as well as gender and age sensitive aid as part of the European Commission's Directorate-General for European Civil Protection and Humanitarian Aid Operations.

The 2016 World Humanitarian Summit inaugurated a 'Grand Bargain' between aid funders and humanitarian organisations, committing to "get more means into the hands of people in need"; the third workstream of the bargain, led by the UK and the World Food Programme is concerned with increasing the use and coordination of cash-based programming. The UN Secretary-General called for cash to be the default method of support for crisis-affected people where the situation allows.

In 2020, CALP, a nonprofit membership organization concerned with capacity building in humanitarian cash and voucher assistance, has issued two 'state of CVA' reports, most recently in 2020. They document that the value of CVA has grown from US$2B in 2015, representing 7.9% of development aid, to US$5.6B in 2019 representing 17.9% of aid. CVA is identified by funders such as the United States Department of State and Caritas Internationalis as an effective, efficient, and appropriate method of aid; Plan International has committed to asking "why not cash?" in the design of its humanitarian responses. The UN World Food Programme, the world's largest humanitarian agency, disbursed US$3.3B in 2020 via CVA – 37% of its total assistance. The Council of the European Union in 2015 endorsed the use of cash transfers, finding "significant scope for increasing the use of multi-purpose cash-based assistance in humanitarian responses, depending on the context". The European Union, through its Directorate-General for European Civil Protection and Humanitarian Aid Operations committed to deliver 35% of humanitarian assistance in the form of cash transfers under the Grand Bargain, and has achieved an increase from 24% of the total budget in 2016 to 34% in 2019 and 2020.

In 2021, technology providers, such as through the GSMA Mobile for Humanitarian Innovation programme, have responded to the opportunity of CVA by developing partnerships with providers, and by working with the wider aid community to promulgate CVA knowledge and solutions.

== Overview ==
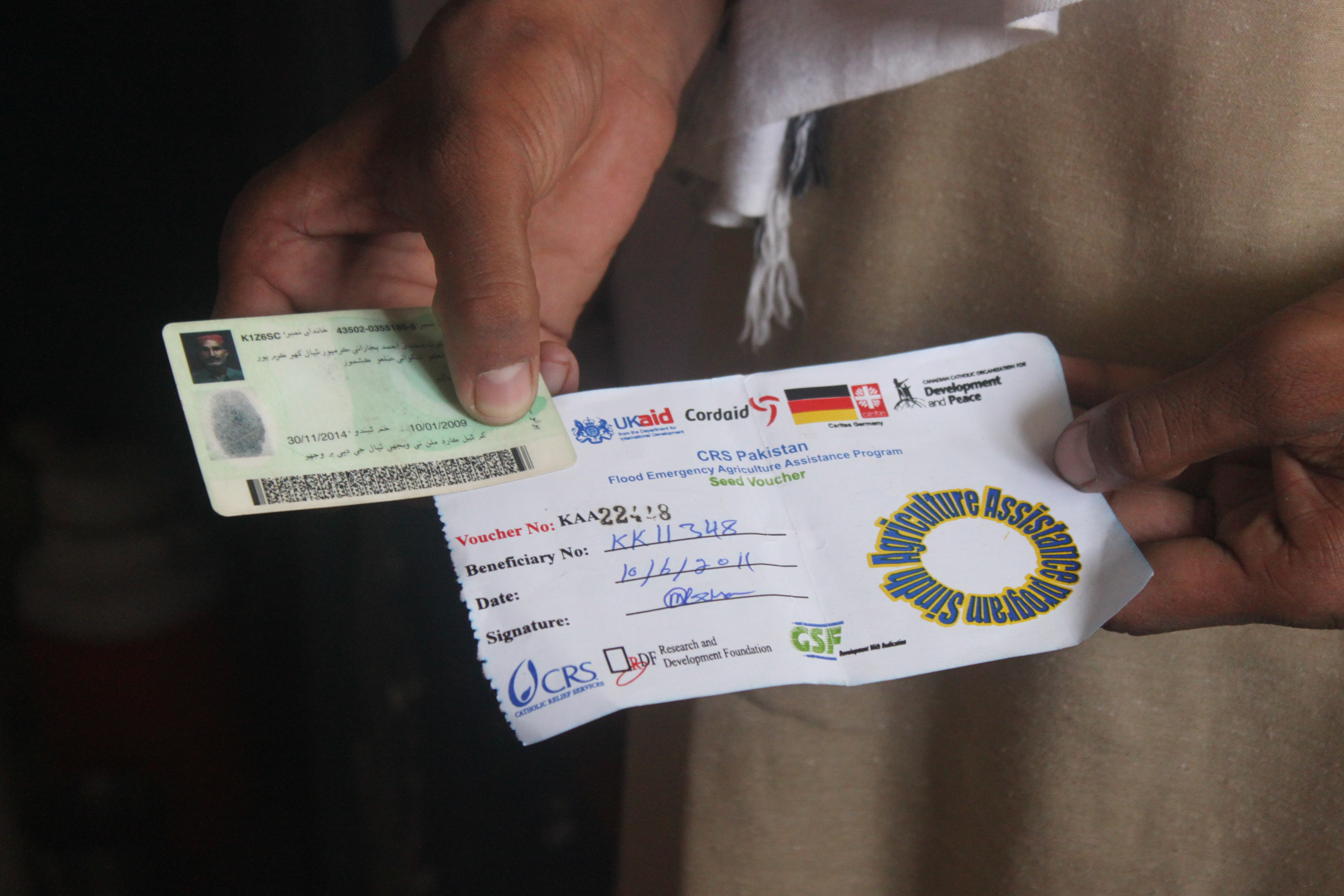
Aid voucher issued in 2011 after 2010 flooding in Pakistan

Cash and Voucher Assistance is an umbrella term for a range of aid activities characterised by the transfer of cash, cash-equivalent or goods and services equivalent resources directly to aid recipients. CVA has also been called, variously, Cash Based Intervention (CBI), Cash Based Assistance (CBA) and Cash Transfer Programming (CTP).

Plan International identify a number of forms of CVA including:

- cash transfers, designed to meet specific needs, but unrestricted in terms of their use - can be conditional or unconditional
- multi-purpose cash transfers, designed for cover some or all of a range of household needs
- value vouchers, exchangeable for goods or services to an indicated value
- commodity vouchers, exchangeable for specified goods or services
- cash for work, a conditional form of CVA requiring the recipient to perform work
- cash for training, requiring the recipient to undertake training

Benefits and advantages of CVA are identified as including:

- choice, dignity and flexibility - enables recipients to prioritise their own spending preferences
- safety - cash can be distributed electronically, obviating the need for recipients to travel to receive aid
- cost efficiency - cash can be distributed at a lower cost than goods and services
- cost effectiveness - CVA can achieve better outputs and outcomes than in-kind aid
- fostering economic recovery and support - CVA supports the development of sustainable local markets
- financial empowerment - CVA can leverage access to additional finance resources such as seed capital
- social protection - CSV can work within wider safety-nets to provide long-term support for vulnerable groups

Mechanisms for CVA include the distribution of cash in-hand; the use of a range of e-cash technologies including mobile-phone based money (mobile money), e-wallets, pre-paid debit cards, or access to money via ATM machines; and the distribution of paper or e-vouchers exchangeable for goods and services.
