= Code of Conduct for the International Red Cross and Red Crescent Movement and NGOs in Disaster Relief =

The Code of Conduct for International Red Cross and Red Crescent Movement and NGOs in Disaster Relief was drawn up in 1992 by the Steering Committee for Humanitarian Response (SCHR) to set ethical standards for organizations involved in humanitarian work. In 1994, the SCHR adopted the code and made the signing of it a condition for membership in the alliance.

== Formulation of the code ==
Although the initiative began with a call by the French Red Cross to the IFRC to draw up a code of conduct relating to humanitarian aid in response to natural disasters, many of the sponsoring agencies had been involved in complex emergencies such as Biafra and Rwanda and were also looking for guidance for operating in the midst of violent conflicts. As of December 2016 more than 600 organizations have signed the code.

In 1995, at the 26th International Conference of the Red Cross and Red Crescent, which included delegates from governments, the Red Cross and Red Crescent National Societies, the IFRC, and the ICRC, a resolution was passed which “took note of” and “welcomed” the code giving it wide international recognition.

== Code articles ==
Principle Commitments of the Code

1. The humanitarian imperative comes first;
2. Aid is given regardless of the race, creed or nationality of the recipients and without adverse distinction of any kind. Aid priorities are calculated on the basis of need alone;
3. Aid will not be used to further a particular political or religious standpoint;
4. We shall endeavor not to be used as an instrument of government foreign policy;
5. We shall respect culture and custom;
6. We shall attempt to build disaster response on local capacities;
7. Ways shall be found to involve program beneficiaries in the management of relief aid;
8. Relief aid must strive to reduce vulnerabilities to future disaster as well as meeting basic needs;
9. We hold ourselves accountable to both those we seek to assist and those from whom we accept resources;
10. In our information, publicity and advertising activities, we shall recognize disaster victims as dignified human beings, not hopeless objects.

== Types of principles ==
The 10 articles of the code fall into two types: Articles 1 through 4 are core humanitarian principles required for humanitarian response. The remaining articles are more aspirational and are important to improving the quality of both humanitarian and developmental work.

The humanitarian imperative, based on the principle of humanity, together with other core principles, impartiality, and independence, stress that humanitarian response must be based on need alone. They are derived, from the Fundamental Principles of the International Red Cross and Red Crescent Movement Red Cross movement. However the principle of neutrality, which is directly related to the special international role of the Red Cross is not included in the code of conduct. Organizations such as military forces and for-profit companies may deliver assistance to communities affected by disaster, but they are not considered by the humanitarian sector as humanitarian agencies as they do not meet all of the core principles.

Articles, 5 through 10, are derived particularly from experience in development work. Most of the original sponsors have had decades of experience working in the development sector and the articles reflect their experience and commitment. Some development agencies are deeply committed to such an approach while being unable to subscribe to the core principles.

== Voluntary nature ==
The code of conduct is a voluntary code which is self-enforced by each of the signatory organizations.

The code includes two annexes, Annex I, Recommendations to governments of disaster affected countries, and Annex II, Recommendations to donor governments.

== Application of the Code ==
The code of conduct is widely used to guide conduct within humanitarian agencies. When the code was drawn up a new term was coined: Non governmental humanitarian agencies (NGHAs), to include the NGOs and the components of the International Red Cross and Red Crescent Movement which are not NGOs.

The Disaster Emergency Committee (DEC) which is based in the UK has used the code for evaluating humanitarian action, beginning with an evaluation of the Gujarat earthquake of 2001 and covering many subsequent evaluations. The evaluators have used the code as a framework, presenting their findings of agencies' performances in relation to each principle in the Code.

== Limits and misinterpretations ==
Evaluators differ about the usefulness of the code. In the DEC evaluation of the Gujarat earthquake of 2001, the evaluators concluded

"The Red Cross Code can be used effectively in evaluation as a measure of quality. In the full report we take each Principle in turn, focus on key issues (as far as possible those specified in the terms of reference) and then examine performance against the Principle. We are able to show which Principles require more attention and thus focus attention on learning."

However, because of the lack of indicators of compliance with code they were forced to rate overall performance based on the aggregation of their impressions and judgement rather than on an objective measurement. The evaluators of the DEC Tsunami Crisis Response were unable to do this because of different perceptions of different team members. However, the opening paragraph of the executive summary of the Tsunami evaluation states

"Following usual DEC practice, the primary measure of assessment is the Red Cross Code. This is a precise set of standards, signed up to by all DEC members; by using the standards, personal judgement by the evaluators can be kept to a minimum."

This is at odds with the conclusions of Hillhorst's review of the code which states:

"The code does not provide ... clear proactive regulation with respect to the provision of humanitarian aid. The code is not regulatory because of its cautious language, with phrases like ‘we shall endeavour to’, instead of ‘we shall’. By using this language, room for manoeuvre is also created for international NGOs with different approaches. The cautious language makes the code comprehensive and appropriate as an instrument for discussing policy and operational matters and dilemmas. It makes the code less useful, though, for NGOs seeking guidance vis-à-vis their actions and for purposes of accountability."

Hillhorst's paper draws on a survey of code signatories and a conference to review the code, as well as detailed analysis of the code itself.
