= Archive Global =

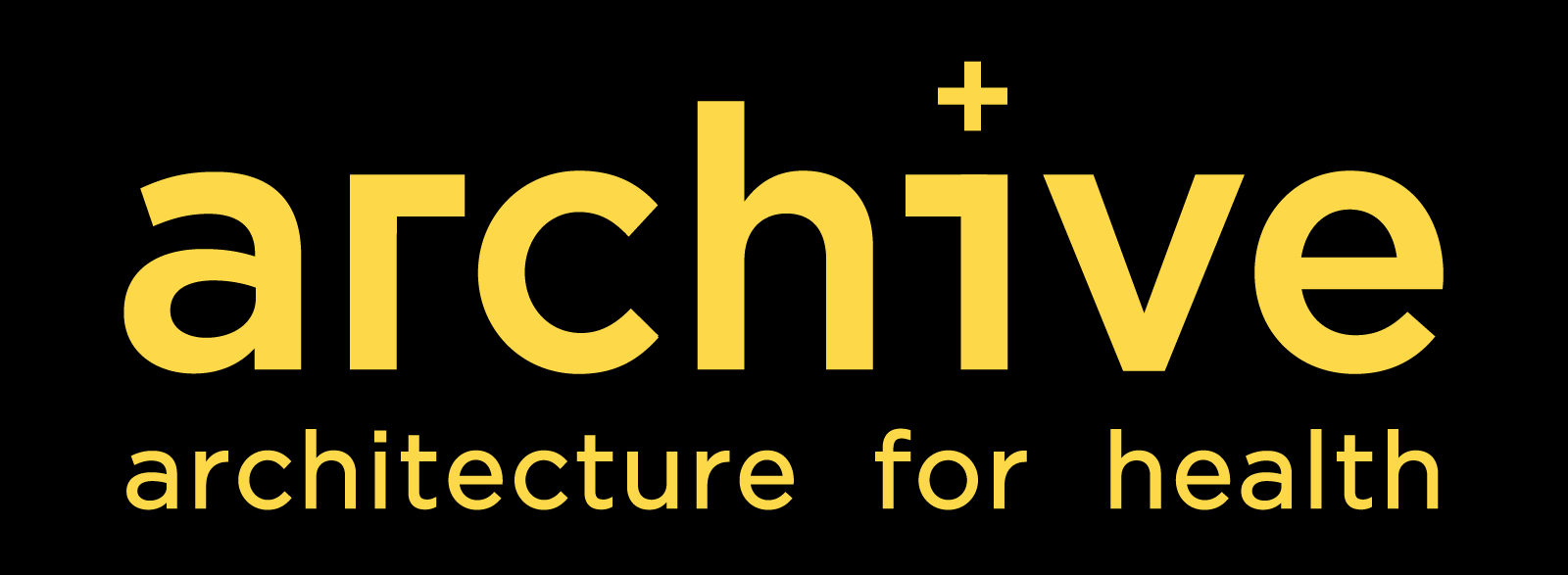
- Founded: 2006
- Founder: Peter Williams
- Purpose: Health, housing, architecture, design and disease
- Region served: United Kingdom, Bangladesh, Cameroon, and Haiti
- Website: archiveglobal.org

Archive Global (stylised ARCHIVE) is an international non-profit organization that focuses on the link between health and housing. 'ARCHIVE,' stylised as an acronym, stands for Architecture for Health In Vulnerable Environments. Archive has ongoing projects in Bangladesh, Cameroon, Haiti, and the UK. Projects implement design solutions in housing to combat diseases such as HIV/AIDS, tuberculosis, malaria, respiratory diseases, diarrheal diseases, and neglected tropical diseases.

== Mission and approach ==
Archive Global focuses on combating diseases among vulnerable communities around through better housing design. On a preventative level, the organization advocates renovating inadequate housing for the economically disadvantaged in a bid to reduce their vulnerability to disease and ill health. It advocates a treatment-based approach by the creation of home-based care facilities.

== History ==
Archive Global was founded by Peter Williams, a Jamaican-born architect, in 2006. Archive was developed from a three-year independent research project at Columbia University on the link between housing and health outcomes in South African communities. In 2005, Williams created a blog to encourage debate around public health policy, planning, epidemics, and architecture. This led to the formation of Archive Global in New York, which in 2006 was followed by the genesis of Archive UK.

== Current projects ==
=== UK ===
In 2010 Archive UK launched the Happy, Healthy Households Partnership with NHS Brent, the Brent Council, the Brent Refugee and Migrant Forum, and various community organizations. The London Borough of Brent was chosen due to the high rate of tuberculosis relative to other boroughs. The purpose of the partnership was to raise awareness of the link between tuberculosis and housing.

=== Haiti ===
In Haiti, Archive Global works in partnership with Housing Works and Foundation Esther Boucicault Stanislas (FEBS). FEBS is a community organization based in Saint-Marc that provides access to medicine and works to improve the quality of life for people living with HIV/AIDS.

In 2010, six months after the 2010 Haiti earthquake Archive Global launched Kay e Sante nan Ayiti (Creole for Housing and Health in Haiti), a project to raise awareness of how housing can form part of a strategy to reduce the transmission of airborne diseases such as TB. As an integral part of the project, a global design competition called on architects, engineers, health specialists and the general public to pool their knowledge and submit housing designs to mitigate disease transmission. A panel chose five winning designs for construction in an integrated community development and healthcare pilot project in the coastal port town of Saint-Marc, in western Haiti, an hour's drive (100 kilometres (62 mi)) from the capital, Port-au-Prince.

Construction began in 2011 on the prototype houses. The winning design, 'Breathe House' was constructed in 2012 by local community members, Archive Global and volunteers from the 'reCOVER 'initiative of the University of Virginia and BGF (Building Goodness Foundation).

=== Cameroon ===
In 2011, Archive Global began work in Yaoundé on a project to reduce the prevalence of malaria in informal settlements. On World Malaria Day in March 2012 an international design competition was launched to find architectural solutions to protect against malaria. Winning designs were announced in October 2012. These designs use screened doors, windows and eaves, and adequate ventilation, sewage and drainage solutions to directly halt vector mosquitoes and reduce the incidence of malaria.

=== Bangladesh ===
In 2013, Archive drafted the plans for Health From the Ground Up, a project targeted towards reducing infant and child mortality in the Bangladeshi capital of Dhaka. Deprivations in living standards (such as flooring and sanitation) contribute to nearly half of all multi-dimensional poverty experienced in Bangladesh. Archive collaborated with ADESH (Association for Development of Economic and Social Help) to establish a pilot-flooring project in 2014. The "Health From the Ground Up" initiative served to replace dirt/mud floors with concrete flooring in Bangladeshi homes to eliminate transmission pathways for gastrointestinal and parasitic pathogens.

== Recognition ==
Archive Global was named by UBS as Charity of the Year in 2012. In 2013, Archive was the winner of the Katerva Award in Urban Design.
