= Andrew Morley (humanitarian) =

British non-profit executive

- Employer(s): World Vision International; Steering Committee for Humanitarian Response (SCHR); Inter-Agency Standing Committee (IASC)

Reverend Andrew Morley is a British non-profit executive, who currently holds a number of humanitarian focused roles. He is chair of the Steering Committee for Humanitarian Response (SCHR), and within the United Nations framework he is a member of the Inter-Agency Standing Committee (IASC). He also serves as President & CEO of World Vision International. Morley is an ordained minister and vicar, after being personally called to ordination by Justin Welby.

Early in his career, Morley held numerous executive and senior management roles at large corporations, including Sky, Cable & Wireless, Harrods Group, Motorola, and Clear Channel UK. He had a focus on digital transformation.

With humanitarian non-profits, he was a member of the Board of Trustees for Christian Aid, and held various advisory positions, including the recent conflict in Ukraine with the Disasters Emergency Committee.
