= Sphere (organization) =

Humanitarian organization

- Formation: 1997; 29 years ago
- Purpose: raising humanitarian standards
- Location: Geneva, Switzerland
- Executive Director: William Anderson
- Publication: The Sphere Handbook
- Revenue: CHF 1,044,833 (2023)
- Expenses: CHF 1,166,118
- Staff: 6 (2024)
- Website: www.spherestandards.org
- Formerly called: Sphere Project

Sphere (formerly known as the Sphere Project) is a global movement started in 1997 aiming to improve the quality of humanitarian assistance. The Sphere standards are the most commonly used and most widely known set of core humanitarian standards. Sphere's flagship publication is The Sphere Handbook.

== Background ==
The 1990s saw a rapid increase in the international activities of humanitarian agencies. This was particularly the case during Great Lakes refugee crisis in 1994. A growing number of donor and NGO evaluations were critical of the responses and actions of many NGOs. There was growing discussion among humanitarian agencies about the lack of standards for providing humanitarian assistance. Some of the preliminary conclusions of the multi-donor Joint Evaluation of Emergency Assistance to Rwanda were critical of the performance of humanitarian agencies in the Great Lakes crisis. A number of agencies felt that it was time to get their own houses in order and explored the idea of formulating standards for humanitarian response.

== Original sponsors and observers ==
Simultaneously, in 1996, discussions were taking place within InterAction and the Steering Committee for Humanitarian Response (SCHR) about a project for setting standards. The members of both organizations decided that it would be a good idea to pool their resources and set up a joint project. Thus, in 1997, the Sphere Project was set up with a management committee made up of representatives from each of the SCHR members and representatives from InterAction. More than 25 percent of the funds for the first phase of the project came from the member agencies of the management committee and the rest from a few government donors. From the beginning, three observers were invited to fully participate in the work of the management committee.

Sponsors:

- SCHR (Care International, Caritas Internationalis, the International Committee of the Red Cross, the International Federation of Red Cross and Red Crescent Societies, International Save the Children Alliance, Lutheran World Federation, Oxfam, World Council of Churches, and Médecins Sans Frontières)
- InterAction (165 US-based members; 62 in its Disaster Response Committee)

Observers:

- Voice
- ICRC
- ICVA

== Project ==
The original objective of the Sphere Project was to develop a humanitarian charter and associated set of minimum standards in collaboration with leading NGOs, interested donor governments and UN agencies, to both disseminate the resultant products widely within the international humanitarian system and to encourage their formal adoption and practice by relief agencies and their donors.

In July 1997, the first phase of one year of the project began.

Five sectors were chosen to cover the basic sectors in humanitarian response:

- water supply and sanitation
- nutrition
- food aid
- shelter and site planning
- health services

== Phase 1 July 1997 to October 1998 ==
=== Setting minimum standards ===
Five sector committees were formed, each with a manager seconded by one of the sponsoring agencies. The sector committees were made up of experts drawn not only from NGOs, but also from the Red Cross and Inter-governmental agencies such as the UNHCR, WHO, and WFP. The sector committees formulated minimum standards of assistance for each of the sectors. The intention of the project was that the setting up of minimum standards would help to improve accountability and the overall quality of humanitarian response to those affected by disasters.

=== Humanitarian charter ===
In early 1998, a working group was established to draft the Humanitarian Charter. Its final draft highlighted the importance of three principles in particular:

- the right to life with dignity,
- the distinction between combatants and non-combatants, and
- the principle of non-refoulement.

By May 1998, a draft edition of the handbook was posted on the Internet for comments. Phase 1 was extended by four months to October 1998.

== Phase 2 November 1998 to January 2000 ==
Phase 2 of the project was initiated in November focusing on the publication and dissemination of the standards and the development of training materials. In December, a first draft was published and launched both in Washington, DC, and London. The first draft notes that it was drawn up with the work of some 641 named individuals (plus countless unnamed persons), drawn from 228 organizations, including NGOs, the Red Cross/Red Crescent Movement, academic institutions, the United Nations and governmental agencies. It was posted on the Sphere Project site to allow for wide feedback.

=== Training ===
Phase 2 saw the development of extensive training material for using the handbook. The training program focuses "mainly on the day-to-day work of the individual humanitarian practitioner." The main method is to use workshops for humanitarian field staff to facilitate the practical application of the minimum standards.

== Phase 3 November 2000 to December 2004 ==
The handbook was completely revised and a second edition was launched in 2004. In addition an extensive external evaluation was carried out. After 2004, Sphere took on anew form, with an expanded board replacing the project's management committee. Its focus shifted towards facilitating the work of people already using and promoting Sphere at national and regional levels.

== Phase 4, An independent, membership-based organisation ==
In 2016, Sphere ceased its activities as a time-limited project (“the Sphere Project”) to become an independent, non-profit organisation (“Sphere”). The organisation also intensified its efforts on building a global community, bringing together those humanitarian practitioners sharing a commitment to improve the quality and accountability of humanitarian assistance.

In June 2018, Sphere launched a membership campaign, inviting humanitarian organisations to formally participate in its governance. Sphere is currently governed by a General Assembly, composed of all Sphere members, and overseen by an Executive Committee, whose officers are elected among the members by the General Assembly. To reflect the new status, Sphere adopted a new logo.

== The Sphere Handbook ==
The Sphere Handbook is Sphere’s flagship publication. It comprises the Humanitarian Charter, the Protection Principles, the Core Humanitarian Standard, and minimum humanitarian standards in four areas of response: Water supply, sanitation and hygiene promotion (WASH); Food security and nutrition; Shelter and settlement; and Health.

The Handbook is likely the most widely known and internationally recognized tool in the field of humanitarian standards. Considering all of its editions, the Sphere Handbook has been translated in more than 30 languages.

The Sphere standards are periodically revised to make sure the Handbook reflects new evidence and evolving practice in the humanitarian sector.

== Humanitarian Standards Partnership ==
In 2015, Sphere and six other humanitarian standard initiatives formally joined to establish the Humanitarian Standards Partnership (HSP). The aim of the Partnership is to improve the quality and accountability of humanitarian action across all sectors and a harmonized approach to support the user in the application of standards. The HSP organizes joint training opportunities, research initiatives, and outreach activities. It also runs advocacy activities calling for an increased application of humanitarian standards.

The other initiatives which compose the HSP are:

- Minimum Standards for Child Protection in Humanitarian Action (CPMS) (Alliance for Child Protection in Humanitarian Action)
- Livestock Emergency Guidelines and Standards (LEGS)
- Minimum Economic Recovery Standards (SEEP Network)
- Minimum Standards for Education (Inter-Agency Network for Education in Emergencies)
- Minimum Standard for Market Analysis (The Cash Learning Partnership (CaLP))
- Humanitarian inclusion standards for older people and people with disabilities (HelpAge International, Age and Disability Capacity Program / ADCAP)

== Funding ==
From the beginning, a decision was made that an important part of the funding would come from the sponsoring agencies themselves, with the remainder made up of funds from governmental agencies. A little over a quarter of the funds for phase 1 came from the SCHR and InterAction with the rest coming from 10 governments. As the budget expanded in Phases 2 and 3, so did the number of government donors, shifting the balance, with governments contributing about 85% of the funds for the latter two phases.

== Criticisms of Sphere ==
Although generally well accepted, a number of criticisms have been levelled against Sphere both in terms of its humanitarian charter and minimum standards. The first critique concerns the Sphere charter. As the charter was developed by NGOs, its legal validity has been called into question. The charter recognizes that affected persons have a ‘right of assistance’ and describes the legal responsibility of states to guarantee that right. However, while the ‘right to dignity’ and ‘right to assist’ are clearly established in international law, the legal basis of a ‘right to assistance’ is not entirely clear. Furthermore, the right to life with dignity described in the charter is intimately linked to social, economic and political rights that are not sufficiently addressed in the charter.

A second criticism has been that Sphere’s “one size fits all” approach prevents humanitarians from adapting to the diverse cultural, political and security contexts in which they operate. Medecins Sans Frontieres (MSF), one of the prominent critics of Sphere, argues that Sphere “tend[s] towards being prescriptive, leaving little room for contextual adaption”, and thus is only useful in an ideal situation. Importantly, a number of French humanitarian agencies feared that donors would disburse funding based on fulfillment of Sphere standards, restricting the ability of agencies to demonstrate success in ways that are not open to formal measurement. They felt that the Sphere approach would ignore non-quantifiable aspects of humanitarian action such as solidarity and witnessing and could devalue efforts of the affected population to solve their own problems

Some critics feared that the standards could create unrealistic expectations while ignoring constraints. Failing to meet core Sphere standards could lead to adverse publicity, liability and reprisals.

A final criticism often raised by non-Western parties is that the Sphere standards impose standardization based on “Western” benchmarks. While Sphere does promote close consultation with the affected populations, it imposes very detailed standards that may differ from the wishes of beneficiaries.
