= CHS Alliance =

Humanitarian assistance organization network

- Core Humanitarian Standard Alliance
- Formation: 2015
- Legal status: Non-profit organisation
- Headquarters: Geneva, Switzerland
- Executive Director: Tanya Wood
- Website: www.chsalliance.org

The CHS (Core Humanitarian Standard) Alliance is a global alliance of non-governmental humanitarian and development organisations committed to improving aid work. The CHS Alliance asserts that organisations deliver higher quality, more effective aid when they are accountable to the people they serve, and that organisations can gain such accountability by applying the Core Humanitarian Standard on Quality and Accountability.

The CHS Alliance is headquartered in Geneva, Switzerland and maintains a presence in London.

== History and mandate ==
The Alliance was formed in 2015 by bringing together the Humanitarian Accountability Partnership (HAP) International, which focused on accountability to affected people, and People in Aid, which focused on people management in the humanitarian aid and development sectors. The Alliance's objectives are:

1. Improved delivery of the CHS Commitments
2. A stronger CHS Alliance movement
3. A more accountable aid system

== Activities ==
The core mandate of the CHS Alliance is to apply and promote the Core Humanitarian Standard on Quality and Accountability (CHS), which was developed HAP International, People In Aid, and (later) Groupe URD. The CHS now forms part of the Sphere Handbook on minimum standards in humanitarian response.

Member organizations undergo Independent verification and certification against the CHS. This verification is conducted by an accredited, third-party auditor – currently this service is offered by Humanitarian Quality Assurance Initiative (HQAI), which was created in 2015 to audit compliance with the CHS. CHS Alliance works closely with HQAI to manage a smooth transition for the organisations they audit. The Core Humanitarian Standard on Quality and Accountability sets out Nine Commitments that organisations and individuals involved in humanitarian response can use to improve the quality and effectiveness of the assistance they provide. CHS Alliance uses indicators from the Nine CHS Commitments to develop indexes that reflect how well the organisation performs across three areas:

- Protection against sexual exploitation, abuse or harassment (PSEAH) – revised in 2020
- Localisation
- Gender and diversity

The CHS Alliance published the Protection from Sexual Exploitation Index and handbook and works with Foreign, Commonwealth and Development Office to create whistleblowing guidance.

In 2021 the CHS Alliance was critical of the use of non disclosure agreements in the aid sector.

== Criticisms ==
Sandrine Tiller of Médecins Sans Frontières described the standards that the CHS Alliance promote as too simplistic and generic. That criticism was rejected by Simon Eccleshall of the International Federation of Red Cross and Red Crescent Societies who said that the simplicity was intentional, considering the wide range of potential users of the standard.
