= Attacks on humanitarian workers =

List of selected major attacks on aid workers

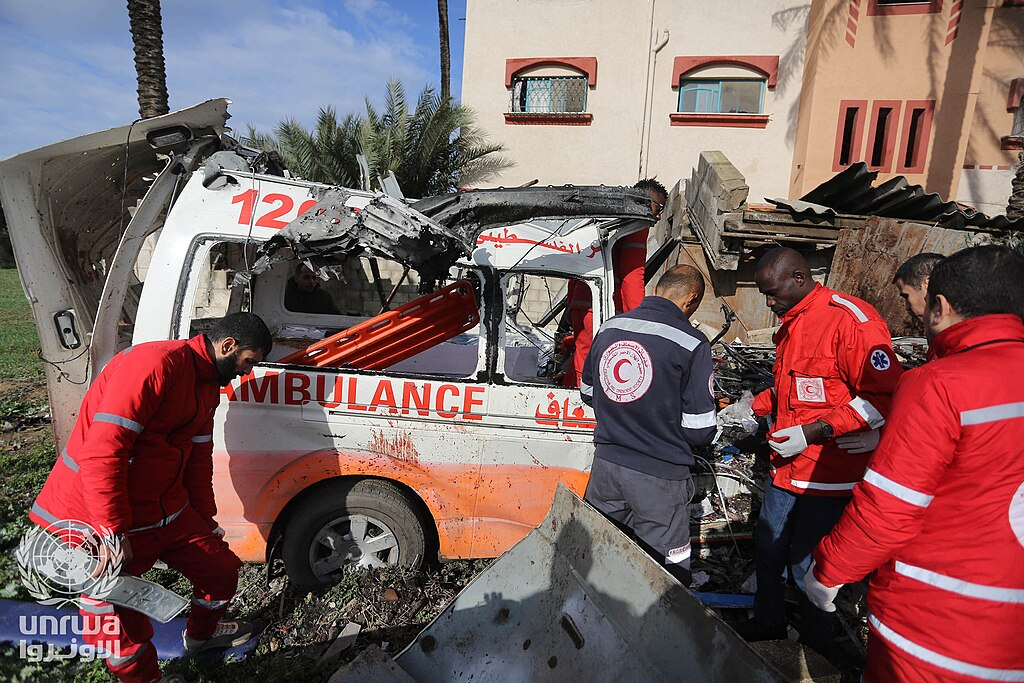
Red Crescent ambulance after Israeli airstrike (2023)

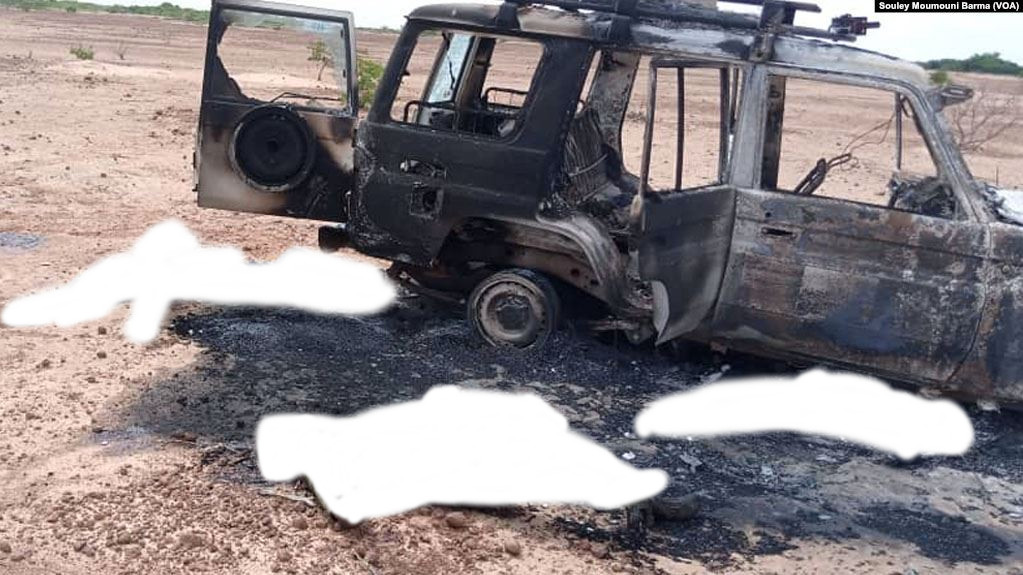
Shooting of French aid workers by Islamic State in Kouré, Niger (2020)

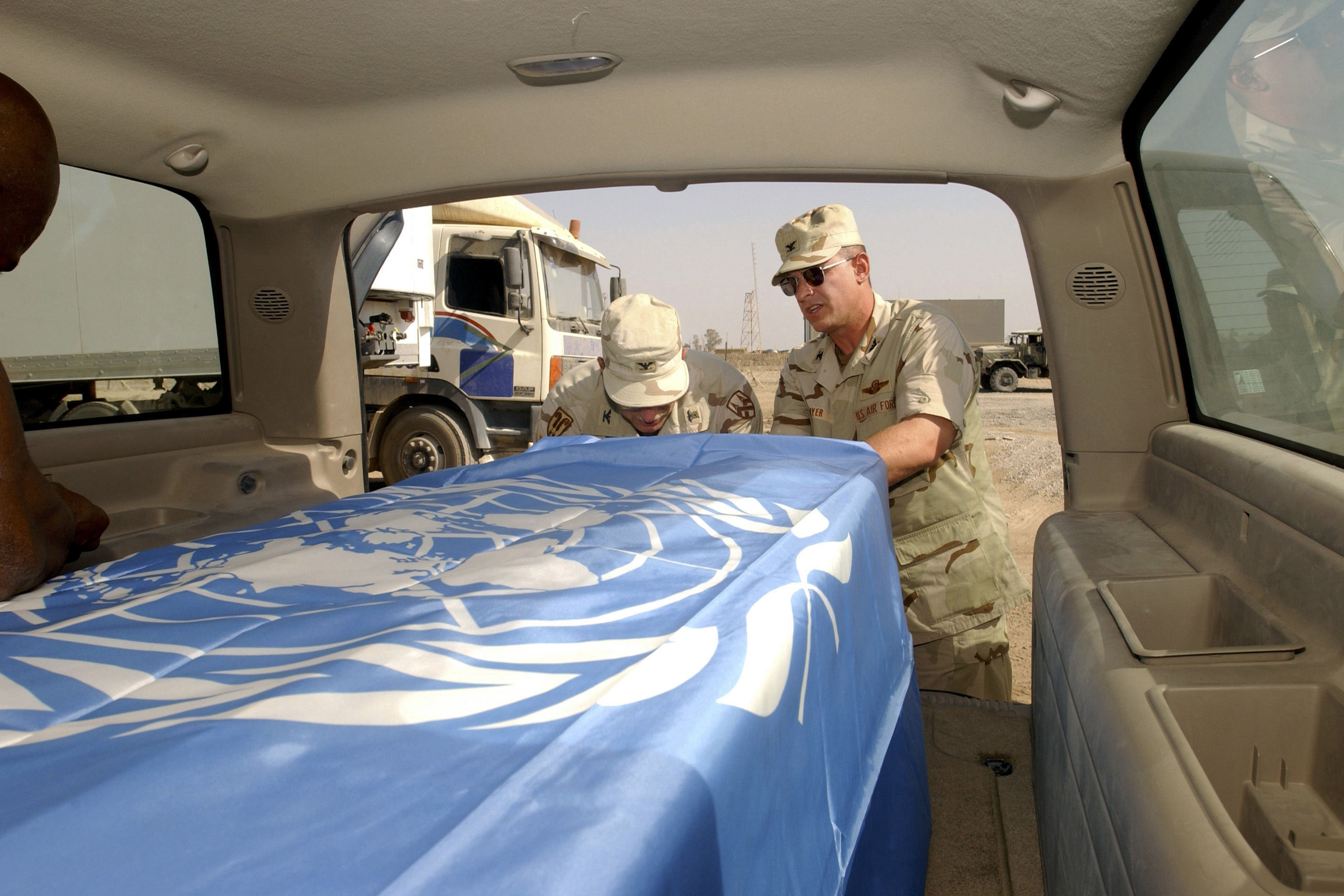
Casket of UN Chief Ambassador to Iraq (2003)

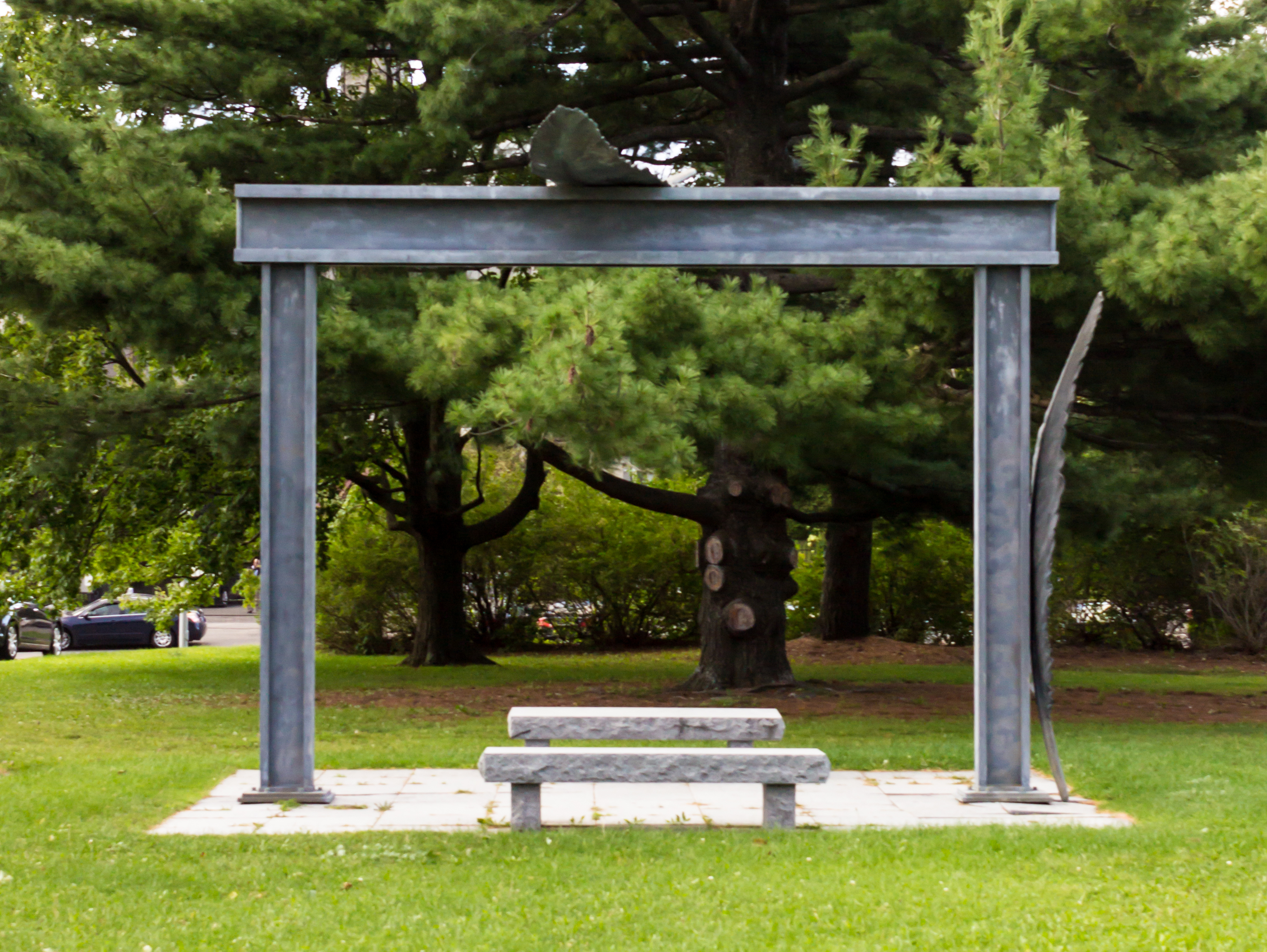
Monument to Canadian Aid Workers

Attacks on humanitarian workers are a leading cause of death among aid workers. Under international humanitarian law, deliberate violence is prohibited against protected persons, including humanitarian aid workers belonging to United Nations agencies, nongovernmental organisations (NGOs), and the International Red Cross and Red Crescent Movement. Attacks have become increasingly more frequent since 1997 when the Aid Worker Security Database (AWSD) began tracking them. This article contains a list of major attacks on humanitarian workers, primarily drawn from the AWSD. A full downloadable list, from 1997–present, can be found on their website.

The number of aid workers attacked has increased from 260 in 2008 to 595 in 2023. For the first 20 years of the AWSD, Afghanistan, South Sudan, Sudan, Somalia, and Syria were consistently the most dangerous places for aid workers to operate. Between 2013 and 2018, an average of 127 aid workers were killed, 120 injured, and 104 abducted worldwide per year. In November 2024, the UN reported that 281 aid workers had been killed that year, making 2024 the deadliest year on record until then; 175 of the deaths occurred in Gaza. Additionally the UN stated that 333 aid workers had been killed thus far in the Gaza war, the highest number recorded in a single crisis. In 2025, violence against aid workers has continued to increase, reaching a new record of nearly 1,200 victims in over 700 incidents, resulting in the killing of 350 aid workers. Far from being an artifact of the increase in volume and operations of humanitarian response, violence against aid workers has drastically increased at the same time as global humanitarian funding has decreased.

The most common causes of death among aid workers are shootings and air strikes, with road travel being particularly dangerous. A large contributor to violence against aid workers is kidnapping, though most end in release after negotiations. Motives for attacks on aid workers are often unknown, but of those that are known the cause is frequently political.

== Background ==
=== Recording attacks on humanitarian workers ===
According to The New York Times, the Aid Worker Security Database is "widely regarded as an authoritative reference for aid organisations and governments in assessing trends in security threats." A project of Humanitarian Outcomes, it receives funding from USAID. Since 1997, it has tracked incidents of violence such as abduction, killing, serious injury, and sexual assault but not safety incidents like vehicle crashes or accidental detonations during mine clearing projects. Aid workers are defined as employees and other staff of non-profit aid organizations providing humanitarian relief, such as the International Red Cross and Red Crescent Movement, non-governmental organizations, UNDP, UNRWA, WHO, UNICEF, and other UN agencies. The database does not track attacks on UN peacekeepers, election monitors, or employees of advocacy organizations.

Armed Conflict Location & Event Data Project (ACLED) is another database that includes attacks on humanitarian workers in addition to other conflict-related incidents. Insecurity Insight produces monthly Aid in Danger reports that highlight attacks during the month from news media, the AWSD and ACLED.

=== Legal basis for the protection of humanitarian workers ===
The legal basis for the protection of humanitarian workers in armed conflicts is contained in the Geneva Conventions of 1949 and the related Protocols I and II of 1977. These treaties outline the rights and obligations of non-combatants who fulfill the criteria of protected persons during armed conflicts. These rights include the right to be treated humanely; to have access to food, water, shelter, medical treatment, and communications; to be free from violence to life and person, hostage taking, and humiliating or degrading treatment; and the prohibition against collective punishment or imprisonment. Protected persons include citizens and nationals of countries that are not a party to the conflict, except if such persons happen to be in the territory of a belligerent power, which maintains diplomatic relations with their home states.

While the Geneva Conventions guarantee protection for humanitarian workers, they do not guarantee access of humanitarian workers to affected areas: governments or occupying forces may, if they wish, ban a relief agency from working in their area. Médecins Sans Frontières was created in 1971 with the express purpose of ignoring this restriction, by providing assistance to populations affected by the Biafran civil war despite the prohibitions of the government of Nigeria.

In addition, the Geneva Conventions do not require that parties to the conflict guarantee the safety of humanitarian workers. The Conventions prohibit combatants from attacking protected persons, and they require occupying forces to maintain general order. However, the Conventions do not require that combating parties provide security escorts, for example, when other factions threaten the safety of protected persons operating in their area.

In 2003, the United Nations Security Council passed Resolution 1502 giving greater protection to humanitarian workers and treating attacks on them as a war crime. ICRC promotes a framework for Neutral Independent Humanitarian Action (NIHA) to enable differentiated role understanding.

=== Trends ===
Accidents and illnesses contribute only a minority of reported aid worker deaths; most are caused by deliberate violence, most often shootings and air strikes. Road travel is by far the most dangerous context for aid workers, who can be attacked via ambushes, IEDs, or fake checkpoints. Others include raids and individual attacks.

A large contributor to violence against aid workers is abduction, though most are not fatal. On average, foreign aid workers are abducted for a longer period than local staff due to higher ransom demands from kidnappers. Previously, abduction was the highest cause of violence, after the number of kidnappings quadrupled between 2002 and 2012.

In 2008, 260 aid workers were attacked, the highest since the AWSD began in 1997. The record increased in 2011 when 308 aid workers were attacked. Between 2013 and 2018, an average of 127 aid workers were killed, 120 injured, and 104 abducted per year. Between 1997 and 2018, the countries with the greatest total number of attacks on aid workers were Afghanistan, South Sudan, Sudan, Somalia, and Syria. During the Global War on Terror, including the Iraq War and War in Afghanistan, the number of attacks in the Middle East and Central Africa grew. After the CIA used a sham polio vaccination program to locate and kill Osama bin Laden, violence against vaccination aid workers increased.

In 2019, the record for aid workers who were attacked increased again to 483. In 2023, 595 aid workers were attacked. 280 aid workers were killed in 33 countries, 163 of which died in Gaza during the first three months of the Gaza War. The countries with the next highest number of deaths were South Sudan with 34 deaths and Sudan with 25. By November 2024, 281 aid workers had been killed, making 2024 the deadliest year for aid workers on record. 175 of the deaths occurred in Gaza. Additionally the UN stated that 333 aid workers had been killed thus far in the Gaza War, the highest number recorded in a single crisis.

Humanitarian organisations are increasingly confronted by quickly developing battlefield circumstances due to current drone developments in many areas of the world. In conflict areas such as Sudan and Ukraine, attacks on humanitarian workers and civilians by drones is increasing significantly and will only further increase in the upcoming years.

=== Motives ===
It is often hard to ascertain a motive for attacks on aid workers; for instance, in 55% of the incidents recorded by the AWSD in 2008, the motive was described as "undetermined". However, of those that were determined, political motivations have increased (29% of the determined total in 2003 to 49% in 2008) relative to economic motivations, or when the victim's status as an aid worker was only incidental. Aid workers can be targeted for political reasons both directly and by association. Sometimes the humanitarian organisation may be targeted for something that it has done or a statement it has made, or simply for the delivery of aid to a population, to whom others do not wish aid to reach. It can also be targeted as a result of being associated as an entity collaborating with a group or government seen as an enemy, leading humanitarian organizations to strive be seen as politically independent and neutral. However, evidence shows that this has little impact and instead that western aid agencies are perceived as an intrinsic part of western governments' agendas and not merely associated with it.

Afghanistan reflected this dynamic during the war on terror when it was one of the most dangerous countries for humanitarian workers to operate. In 2007, 61% of incidents there were carried out by criminals and 39% by political opposition groups, but in 2008, 65% of incidents were the work of armed opposition groups. According to a 2009 report by Humanitarian Outcomes, this increase in politically motivated attacks may have occurred because Afghan locals stopped distinguishing between organisations who worked with the US military and those who did not, with the notable exception of the ICRC. In remote areas, humanitarian workers sometimes represented the only accessible western target. However, at least two studies did not find evidence indicating heightened aid worker insecurity in provinces where the US military was present.

== Afghanistan ==
=== War in Afghanistan (2001–2021) ===
==== 2000s ====
- November 2001 – Eight foreign aid workers were rescued after the Taliban imprisoned them on charges of spreading Christianity.
- November 2003 – UNHCR staff person Bettina Goislard was shot dead by a motorcycle-borne gunman while travelling by car in Ghazni.
- March 2003 – ICRC staff member Ricardo Munguia was shot and killed in an ambush north of Kandahar. He was working as a water engineer in Afghanistan and travelling with local colleague when their car was stopped by unknown armed men. He was killed execution-style at point-blank range while his colleagues were allowed to escape. The killing prompted the ICRC to temporarily suspend operations across Afghanistan.
- February 2004 – Five Afghans working for the Sanayee Development Foundation were killed when their vehicle was ambushed northeast of Kabul.
- June 2004 – Five staff working for Médecins Sans Frontières were killed on the road between Khairkhana and Qala e Naw in Badghis Province, resulting in the complete withdrawal of MSF from Afghanistan. The names of the murdered staff were: Hélène de Beir, Willem Kwint, Egil Tynaes, Fasil Ahmad and Besmillah.
- May 2006 — Two Malteser International workers were killed and one UNICEF worker was injured while driving back from a mission in a UN vehicle near Herat.
- May 2006 — Three female Afghan employees of Action Aid and their driver were killed by Taliban in the northern province of Jowzjan.
- January 2008– Six people, including at least one aid worker from the USA named Thor Hesla, were killed in the Kabul Serena Hotel attack.
- January 2008 – Cyd Mizell, an aid worker with the Asian Rural Life Foundation, and her Afghan driver were kidnapped in Kandahar. They were presumed dead. The FBI recovered Mizell's skeletal remains in 2023 after offering a $5 million reward for information.
- August 2008 – Three female International Rescue Committee (IRC) workers and their local driver were killed in an ambush as they drove back to Kabul from Logar Province. One was an American national.
- October 2008 – Gayle Williams, an aid worker with SERVE Afghanistan, was killed as she walked to work in Kabul.
- October 2009 – Five United Nations staff, two Afghan security personnel, and an Afghan civilian were killed by three Taliban attackers in an assault on the Bekhtar Guesthouse in Kabul. Nine other UN staff, also there working for the presidential election, were wounded.

==== 2010s ====
- March 2010 — Said Anwar was shot and killed by gunmen.
- August 2010 – On their way back to Kabul after a three week optometry expedition, ten International Assistance Mission aid workers were ambushed, robbed, and executed one by one in Badakhshan. Initially, the Taliban claimed responsibility, but as of 2011, the perpetrator was unknown. The team lead, optometrist Tom Little, was posthumously awarded the Presidential Medal of Freedom.
- September 2010 — British aid worker Linda Norgrove and three Afghan colleagues were kidnapped by the Taliban. Norgrove died after sustaining injuries from a grenade thrown by US forces attempting to rescue her.
- December 2010 — A German aid worker was killed and an Afghan colleague was injured on their way to Mazar-i-Sharif by the Taliban.
- May 2013 – An ICRC compound in Jalalabad was attacked by a suicide bomber and gunmen, resulting in the death of a guard and injuries to an employee.
- July 2014 – Two Finnish aid workers with the International Assistance Mission, a Christian medical charity, were shot and killed in Herat by two men on motorbikes. The women were in a taxi when shot.
- October 2015 – The Kunduz hospital airstrike by the United States military killed 42 Médecins Sans Frontières staff and patients.
- February 2017 – Six Red Cross members were killed and two were kidnapped by suspected members of the Islamic State in the northern province of Jowzjan. The kidnapped members were later released.
- September 2017 – A Spanish Red Cross physiotherapist, Lorena Enebral Perez, was killed by one of her patients in Mazar-e Sharif.
- November 2019 – United Nations Development Programme aid workers were attacked and one, Anil Raj, was killed in Kabul.
- December 2019 – Dr. Tetsu Nakamura and five other staff from Peace Japan Medical Services were shot and killed on their way to work in Jalalabad. Nakamura had agreed to travel with security guards after he was warned of a potential attack.

==== 2020s ====
- May 2020 – In the May 2020 Afghanistan attacks, gunmen targeted the maternity ward of Dasht-e-Barchi hospital in Kabul, run by MSF, killing at least 24 people – including mothers, young children, and an MSF midwife.
- June 2021 — Eleven HALO Trust workers were killed and 15 others wounded during an attack by the Islamic State – Khorasan Province (ISIS-K) in Baghlan.
- August 2021 — The United States Central Command attacked a crowded residential area in the August 2021 Kabul drone strike. The strike killed 10 members of an Afghan family, including Zemari Ahmadi, an aid worker for Nutrition & Education International who had applied for refugee status in the US. Initially, the US justified the strike, stating that Ahmadi was an ISIS-K militant planning to attack the airport. After an investigation by The New York Times, the US called the strike a "tragic mistake", stating that Ahmadi had not been a threat.

=== 2025 ===
- January 2025 – Thirty-four humanitarian workers were arrested by the Taliban.

== Algeria ==
=== Insurgency in the Maghreb (2002 – present) ===
- December 2007 – Ten United Nations staff died in a double car bombing in the capital, Algiers, which killed at least 26 people and injured 177. The attack was claimed by al-Qaeda Organization in the Islamic Maghreb (AQIM).
- October 2011 – Three European aid workers were abducted from a refugee camp near Tindouf. The refugee camp blamed the abductions on AQIM.

== Bangladesh ==
- September 2015– ISIS claimed responsibility for the killing of Italian aid worker Cesare Tavella in Dhaka.

== Belgium ==
=== World War I ===
- October 1915 – Edith Cavell was a British Red Cross nurse who was executed for helping 200 Allied soldiers escape German-occupied Belgium.

== Bosnia and Herzegovina ==
=== Bosnian war (1992 – 1995) ===
- January 1993 – Three British aid workers from Crown Agents/ UNHCR were ambushed in their vehicle in Zenica. One, Paul Goodall, died and the other two were wounded while fleeing. Three of the gunmen were later killed by security forces; another was arrested but escaped.
- July 1993 – Christine Witcutt, a Scottish aid worker from Edinburgh Direct Aid, was shot and killed by a sniper after delivering supplies to a Sarajevo hospital.

== Burundi ==
=== Burundian civil war (1993 – 2005) ===
- June 1996 – Three Swiss ICRC workers were killed in an attack on two vehicles on the road between the villages of Rugombo and Mugina in Cibitoke Province, resulting in a withdrawal of the ICRC from Burundi.
- December 2000 – A British voluntary worker, Charlotte Wilson, was one of 20 people killed by gunmen in the Titanic Express massacre.

=== 2007 ===
- December – An Action Against Hunger vehicle was targeted by shooters in Ruyigi. Five people, including three female expatriate staff of Action Against Hunger, were inside the vehicle. One of them, a French psychologist, died upon arrival at the hospital in Gitega as a result of her injuries. The second victim suffered a gunshot wound. The third expatriate escaped uninjured.

== Central African Republic ==
- June 2007 – An MSF logistician was killed when her car was hit by gunfire during an assessment mission near Paoua
- November 2009 – Two French aid workers employed by Triangle Generation Humanitaire were kidnapped in Birao and held for 4 months before being freed in Darfur.

== Chad ==
- May 2008 – The country director of Save the Children UK was shot dead when his car was attacked near Hadjer Hadid.
- August 2009 – A logistician working for MSF and his Chadian assistant were kidnapped in Ade. The Chadian was freed soon afterwards while the logistician was released a month later.
- June 2010 – A logistician working for Oxfam GB was kidnapped in Abéché. He was rescued 10 days later by security forces near the border with Sudan.

== Chechnya ==
- December 1996 – Six ICRC workers were killed in an attack on the Novye Atagi hospital. ICRC withdrew all expatriate staff from Chechnya.
- August 2009 – Two Chechen aid workers were kidnapped and murdered.

== Dagestan ==
- August 2002 – A Dutch MSF worker, Arjan Erkel, was abducted in Makhachkala. He was released 20 months later.

== Democratic Republic of the Congo ==
=== Congo Crisis (1960 – 1965) ===
- August 1964 – Two UN officials, Jean Plicque and Francois Preziosi, were killed by rebels. Plicque was a member of the ILO, and Preziosi was the first member of UNHCR to be killed in the line of duty.

=== Second Congo War (1998 – 2003) ===
- April 2001 – Six ICRC staff were killed.

=== Kivu conflict ===
- November 2023 — A humanitarian convoy of eight vehicles was attacked by armed men in the Fizi territory. Fifteen members from the NGOs Congo Handicap (CH) and Action Communautaire pour le Développement Durable (ACDD), along with two humanitarian workers, were kidnapped, and three of the vehicles were set on fire. The two humanitarian workers were released later that day.
- June 2024 – Two aid workers of Tearfund were killed and several injured in an attack on their aid convoy near Butembo.
- February 2025 – Three local HEKS/EPER employees were attacked and killed in the Rutshuru Territory of North Kivu. As a result, the Swiss aid organization temporarily suspended all activities in the region.
- February 2025 – 49-year-old Médecins Sans Frontières (MSF) member Jerry Muhindo Kavali was shot during an attack on his organization's base in Masisi. He died two days later in a hospital in Goma.

== Ethiopia ==
=== Somali Civil War ===
- September 2008 – A nurse and a doctor working for Medecins du Monde were kidnapped in Fadhigaradle village (Somali Region) and taken across the border to Somalia. They were released 4 months later.

=== War in Amhara (2018 – present) ===
- August 2024 – Ethiopian Yared Melese, a staff member of ASDEPO (Action for Social Development and Environmental Protection Organization), was kidnapped for ransom and killed by a criminal armed group in Dawunt Woreda.
- September 2024 – Plan International member Teklemariam Tarekegn was killed in Debre Mewi, Amhara.

=== Tigray war (2020 – 2022) ===
- May 2021 – Ethiopian Negasi Kidane, staff member of CISP (International Committee for the Development of Peoples) was killed by a stray bullet in Tigray.
- June 2021 – Three MSF staff were killed while looking for injured people in the Tigray region. According to investigators, they were shot by the Ethiopian military because a commander did not want MSF staff to work in an active combat zone.

== Guinea ==
- September 2000 – Killing of one UNHCR staff member and the abduction of another in Macenta.

== Indonesia ==
=== East Timorese crisis (1999 – 2002) ===
- September 2000 – Five UNHCR staff members were killed when their office was attacked by militia in Atambua, Belu Regency, West Timor.

=== Insurgency in Aceh (1976 – 2005) ===
- December 2000 – Three aid workers were forced out of their vehicle and taken to an abandoned house where they were shot to death. One aid worker escaped and accused Indonesian security forces of carrying out the attack.

== Iran ==
- February 2022 to May 2023 – Belgian aid worker Olivier Vandecasteele was injured while detained on charges of espionage. According to his family and Amnesty International, he was held in "inhumane conditions" equivalent to torture. He was later released in a prisoner exchange.

== Iraq ==
=== Iraq War (2003–2011) ===
- August 2003 – The Canal Hotel bombing targeted the UN headquarters and killed at least 24 people including UN Special Representative for Iraq Sérgio Vieira de Mello and aid worker Gillian Clark.
- October 2003 – An attack on the ICRC building killed at least 12 people in Baghdad.
- April 2005 – Marla Ruzicka, founder of the Center for Civilians in Conflict (CIVIC), and her Iraqi translator, Faiz Ali Salim, were killed by a suicide car bombing on Airport Road in Baghdad.

=== War in Iraq (2013–2017) ===
- December 2016 – Four Iraqi aid workers and several civilians were killed by mortar fire during aid distribution in Mosul.

== Israel ==
=== October 7 attacks ===
- Magen David Adom (MDA) paramedic Amit Mann was a first responder and transported injured people from the Be’eri massacre to the local clinic. She was killed at the clinic. MDA paramedic Aharon Haimov was killed by Hamas gunmen while driving an ambulance responding to emergency calls from the battle of Ofakim. Lior Rudaeff, an Argentinian-Israeli MDA volunteer and part of the Kibbutz' emergency security squad, was killed during the Nir Yitzhak attack. His body was taken to Gaza by Hamas. German-Israeli United Hatzalah member and MDA volunteer Dolev Yehud was killed by Hamas during the Nir Oz massacre. United Hatzalah reported that four of their volunteers were injured, including an Arab doctor who was shot and used as a human shield before being rescued by the IDF.

== Kenya ==
=== Dadaab Refugee Camp ===
- October 2011 – Two Spanish women who worked for Médecins sans Frontières were kidnapped by gunmen and released in July 2013.
- July 2012 – Two Norwegian Refugee Council vehicles were attacked while traveling. A Kenyan driver was killed, and Steve Dennis and four other international staff were abducted for several days. After their rescue by a militia, Dennis sued Norwegian Refugee Council for negligence and was awarded 4.4 million Norwegian kroner.

== Lebanon ==
=== 2006 Lebanon War ===
- July — The Israeli military struck 2 Lebanese Red Cross ambulances in Qana with 2 missiles, injuring the 6 workers and 3 patients inside. The 2 ambulances were destroyed, and the Lebanese Red Cross stopped operations and demanded that the IDF ensure their safety.

=== 2007 Lebanon conflict ===
- June – Two Lebanese Red Cross workers were killed during fighting between the Lebanese army and Fatah al-Islam militants at the Nahr al-Bared refugee camp. The perpetrator and cause of the deaths are disputed.

== Lesotho ==
- January 1999 – Irish aid worker Ken Hickey was robbed and murdered.

== Madagascar ==
- December 2021 – 23-year-old humanitarian worker Todisoa Andrinirina Fitiavana was killed in an attack while en route to oversee a food distribution by the World Food Programme (WFP) in the Amboasary district of southern Madagascar.

== Mali ==
=== War in the Sahel (2011 – present) ===
- June 2022 – Two Red Cross workers were killed when armed men on motorcycles shot at their clearly marked vehicle.
- March 2023 – Two ICRC staff members were kidnapped and later released on March 20.
- October 2024 – An MSF team was attacked and robbed by armed men in the Segou region.

== Niger ==
=== War in the Sahel (2011 – present) ===
- August 2020 – In the Kouré shooting, six French ACTED aid workers, their Nigerian driver and a companion were killed by Islamic State – West Africa Province while visiting a giraffe reserve.
- January 2025 – A 73-year-old Austrian aid worker, Eva Gretzmacher, was kidnapped by gunmen in Agadez city. Gretzmacher lived in the city for more than 20 years and worked with various organizations.

== Nigeria ==
=== Boko Haram insurgency (2009 – present) ===
- August 2011 – The United Nations Headquarters in Abuja was attacked by a suicide car bomber, killing at least 18 people, injuring dozens, and causing massive devastation to the building itself. Boko Haram claimed responsibility.
- July 2016 – A humanitarian convoy was attacked in Borno State, and a UNICEF worker was injured.
- January 2017 – Six aid workers were killed, 8 seriously wounded, and numerous civilians were killed following a government airstrike on a refugee camp in Rann, Borno State.
- March 2018 — Three humanitarian workers and eight security personnel were killed. Midwives Saifura Khorsa and Hauwa Liman, both working for ICRC, were kidnapped and murdered months later on September 16 and October 16 by Boko Haram. The nurse Alice Loksha, working for UNICEF, was also kidnapped and managed to escape in October 2024 after 6 years in captivity.
- July 2020 – Five aid workers of were abducted and later executed in Borno state by a group thought to be Islamic State – West Africa Province.
- October 2024 – Two aid workers were captured and later executed by Boko Haram.
- December 2024 – Two aid workers were captured and later executed by Islamic State West Africa Province (ISWAP) near Zari town in Borno State.

== Pakistan ==
- October 2009 – Three United Nations staff killed in a suicide bombing attack against the office of the World Food Programme in the capital city Islamabad by the Pakistani Taliban.
- March 2010 — Six employees of World Vision were killed and six severely injured when their office in the Mansehra district was targeted for "running programs to help women" in the North-West Frontier Province. 15 gunmen stormed the office, started shooting, threw a bomb and left.
- July 2012 – UN polio vaccine doctor from Ghana was shot in Karachi. His driver was also injured.
- December 2012 – A series of attacks occurred against a polio eradication program, killing five female health workers, including one teenage volunteer in Karachi and Peshawar.

== Palestine ==
=== First Intifada (1987-1993) ===
- According to the Palestine Red Crescent Society, Israeli forces regularly attacked ambulances by firing on them, assaulting their crews, or preventing them from transporting patients to hospital. These attacks occurred in various locations including Jabalia, Hableh, Nablus, and Saeer. In January 1988, Israeli forces commandeered an ambulance and used it to transport themselves into Bani Na'im village.

=== Second Intifada (2000-2005) ===
- March 2002 – A PRCS ambulance was attacked by the IDF, causing the oxygen tanks to catch fire. A second ambulance sent to rescue the first was also attacked. Khalil Suleiman, head of PRCS emergency medical services, was killed and five other ambulance workers from both ambulances were injured.
- November 2002 – Iain Hook, an UNRWA project manager from the UK, was shot and killed by an Israeli sniper in Jenin. Caoimhe Butterly, an Irish human rights activist, was also shot in the foot.

=== Gaza War (2008–2009) ===
- January 2009 – The UN paused operations in Gaza after the Israeli military killed two staff in a marked UN vehicle and killed more than 46 Palestinians taking refuge in UN schools.

=== Blockade of the Gaza Strip (June 2007 – present) ===
- May 2010 – During the Gaza flotilla raid, the Israeli navy killed 9 members of the Gaza Freedom Flotilla attempting to bring aid to the Gaza Strip and breach the Israeli naval blockade.

=== 2018–2019 Gaza border protests ===
- June 2018 — Rouzan al-Najjar, a Palestinian Medical Relief Society medic, was shot and killed by the Israeli military while trying to reach injured protesters.
- August 2018 — Abed Abdullah Qotati, a volunteer paramedic with Nabd Al-Hayat, was shot and killed by the Israeli military along with the injured protester he was treating near the Gaza—Israel barrier.
- June 2019 — Mohammed Sobhi al-Judeili, a Palestinian Red Crescent Society paramedic, died from his injuries a month after being shot in the head by an Israeli sniper.

=== Gaza war (2023 – present) ===
==== 2024 ====
- January – Two Palestinian Red Crescent (PRCS) paramedics tried to rescue Hind Rajab, a five-year-old girl who was stranded in a car with her relatives' bodies after they were killed by an Israeli tank. On February 10, the paramedics were found dead in their ambulance close to the car containing the dead bodies of Rajab and her family. According to a Forensic Architecture investigation, the Israeli military is responsible, but they have denied involvement.
- April – An Israeli airstrike killed seven World Central Kitchen (WCK) aid workers and their Palestinian driver after entering Gaza to coordinate the transfer of food to a warehouse. After approving the route of the convoy, the Israel Defense Forces (IDF) targeted three vehicles consecutively with three missiles. WCK accused the IDF of deliberately targeting the convoy "car by car", and the IDF claimed they had mistakenly targeted an aid worker they thought was a Palestinian gunman.
- September – Islam Hijazi, director of Heal Palestine, was killed by three Palestinian gunmen near a hospital in Khan Younis.
- November – UNRWA reported that 97 of 109 aid trucks entering Gaza were attacked and looted by Palestinian gunmen, causing injuries to staff, near Israeli military installations at the Kerem Shalom crossing. Aid workers, locals, and others stated that Hamas was not involved in the increase in looting, instead attributing it to rival gangs and Israeli targeting of convoy security guards.
- November – Israeli strikes killed multiple aid workers from organizations including Save the Children, World Central Kitchen, and Gaza Soup Kitchen

==== 2025 ====
- January – WFP reported that the Israeli military fired at least 16 bullets at their aid convoy. The attack was condemned by Cindy McCain on X.
- March – The UN reported that the Israeli military attacked their compound in Deir al-Balah, killing a Bulgarian staff member and seriously injuring six other staff. The staff were members of the United Nations Mine Action Service. The UN called for an independent investigation and removed 30% of their international staff from Gaza. Israeli denied responsibility for the attack until April when they stated an Israeli tank had mistakenly fired on the UN compound. Bulgaria opened an investigation in May for the murder of a person under international protection.
- March – World Central Kitchen reported that the Israeli military attacked one of its food distribution programs during meal time. The attack killed one of its volunteers and injured six other people.
- March – The bodies of 8 missing PRCS staff were recovered in a mass grave along with their ambulances and the bodies of 6 other emergency responders and an UNRWA worker. The Israeli military said they had targeted Hamas fighters and that the convoy had approached without their lights on. However, video footage showed the Israeli military shooting at the clearly marked emergency vehicles. According to a New York Times investigation, Israeli forces bulldozed the site after the attack. The Rafah paramedic massacre was the deadliest attack on IFRC workers since 2017.
- August – The Palestinian Red Crescent Society reported that the Israeli air force launched multiple strikes on their headquarters in Khan Younis. One staff member was killed and 2 were injured in the first strike. A civilian who attempted to put out the fire was also injured. The building was struck two more times while staff were leaving.

== Rwanda ==
- March 2000 – A Liberian Voluntary Humanitarian was killed in his car in Kigali.

== Serbia ==
- May 1999 – Three aid workers, including Steve Pratt, were put on trial for spying in Belgrade.

== Sierra Leone ==
=== Sierra Leone Civil War (1991–2002) ===
- June 2000 – British aid worker Alan Smith was freed after being held for one month by the Revolutionary United Front.

== Somalia ==
=== Somali Civil War ===
==== 1990s ====
- January 1993 – A gunman killed Sean Devereux, a British worker for UNICEF in Kismayu.
- February 1993 – Gunmen killed Valerie Place, an Irish nurse with the charity Concern.
- November 1997– The UN successfully negotiated with clan elders for the release of five aid workers kidnapped from a boat in the Somaliland region.
- April 1998 – 10 aid workers were held hostage.

==== 2000s ====
- January 2000 – Attacks on a convoy of aid vehicles left 20 people dead.
- March 2001 – The MSF compound was attacked by gunmen in Mogadishu.
- February 2002 – A Somali UN worker was kidnapped in Mogadishu hours after the region was declared too dangerous for permanent UN presence.
- March 2007 – 2007 Mogadishu TransAVIAexport Airlines Il-76 crash
- December 2007 – A nurse and a doctor working for MSF in Bossaso were abducted. After one week, they were released.
- January 2008 – A surgeon, a logistician and a driver working for Médecins Sans Frontières (MSF) were killed by a roadside explosion while traveling between the hospital and their base in Kismayo.
- October 2008 – A senior programme assistant for the World Food Programme (WFP) was shot and killed as he left a mosque in Merka.
- October 2008 – The Hargeisa–Bosaso suicide bombings targeted government and UN buildings, which killed 30 people, including two UN staff.
- April 2009 – Two MSF doctors were kidnapped and released 9 days later in Bakool.

==== 2010s ====
- December 2011 – A doctor and a logistician working for MSF were shot to death in their compound in Mogadishu.
- January 2012 – Two aid workers were rescued from their kidnappers by a group of Navy Seals.
- October 2017 – Six aid workers were killed and 13 seriously wounded by a vehicle-borne IED in Mogadishu.

==== 2020s ====
- April 2024 – Turkish aid worker Abdurrahim Yörük and a local aid worker (both working for Verenel Derneği) were killed by Al-Shabaab. They were delivering food aid to a displaced persons camp in Mogadishu when an improvised explosive device (IED) killed them.

== South Sudan ==
=== Lord's Resistance Army insurgency (2002–2005) ===
- November 2005 – Collin Lee, who worked for International Aid Services died when his jeep, containing his wife and driver, was ambushed by the LRA.

=== South Sudanese Civil War (2013—2020) ===
- February 2015—A British aid worker was followed and shot by gunmen while entering the Carter Center office compound in Juba.
- July 2016—During the Battle of Juba (2016), South Sudanese soldiers attacked people, including foreign aid workers, in a hotel compound. The attack included the killing of a local journalist, assaults, mock executions, and gang rapes. After an investigation found that UN peacekeepers failed to respond to calls for help, their commander was removed from his position. In August 2018, 10 soldiers were sentenced to prison for the attack.
- March 2017—Six aid workers were killed in an attack that occurred while they were traveling from Juba to Pibor.
- April 2018— An aid worker was shot and killed while traveling in a Catholic Organization for Relief and Development Aid vehicle. The UN condemned the attack and urged for the SPLA-IO to release 7 other South Sudan Health Association aid workers who had been held for a month.

=== 2023 ===
- November 2023 — An employee of World Vision was killed in Warrap State.

== Sri Lanka ==
=== Sri Lankan civil war (1983–2009) ===
- August 2006 – In the Trincomalee massacre of NGO workers, 17 aid workers from Action Against Hunger were found murdered in Muttur. They were working on post-2004 tsunami reconstruction. There had been fierce fighting in the area for more than a week.
- June 2007 – Two local Red cross workers were abducted and murdered in Colombo.

== Sudan ==
=== War in Darfur (2003–2020) ===
- October 2004 – A Save the Children vehicle was hit by an anti-tank landmine in the Um Barro area in North Darfur. Two members of staff travelling in the vehicle were killed, namely Rafe Bullick (British, Programme Manager, North Darfur) and Nourredine Issa Tayeb (Sudanese, Water Engineer).
- December 2004 - Two Save the Children UK workers, Abhakar el Tayeb and Yacoub Abdel Nabi Ahmed, were taken out of their car at a checkpoint and murdered in cold blood, even though they and the vehicle were clearly identifiable as humanitarian workers
- July 2009 – Sharon Commins and Hilda Kawuki, two GOAL aid workers, were kidnapped in Darfur and held for 4 months. The Sudanese government denied reports that they had paid a ransom to secure her release. After her release, Commins accused GOAL of taking insufficient safety precautions.
- October 2009 – A French ICRC delegate was kidnapped and released after 5 months in West Darfur.

=== Sudanese civil war (2023–present) ===
- December 2023 — Two ICRC staff were killed and 7 injured during an attack on a aid convoy in Khartoum.
- May 2024 – Two ICRC drivers were shot and killed in South Darfur. Three ICRC aid workers suffered serious injuries but survived the incident.
- May 2024 – Sudanese Red Crescent Society (SRCS) volunteer Bashir Shuaib was killed.
- April 2024 – Three Sudanese World Food Programme staff members named Osman Ali, Siddig Mohammed, and Yousif Elzain were killed in a remote area in North Darfur.
- June 2024 – Voluntary aid worker Abdul Rahman Al-Hadi Adlan was detained and later killed by the Rapid Support Forces (RSF) in Kabkabiya.
- June 2024 – Eight aid workers were killed in North Dafur.
- July 2024 – Three UN World Food Programme (WFP) trucks on their way to Central Darfur were attacked and looted by armed men.
- December 2024 – Three members of the World Food Programme were killed in an airstrike that hit their field office in Yabus, Blue Nile state.
- January 2025 – An MSF ambulance was attacked while transporting a woman in labor to a hospital. One female caretaker was shot and died.
- February 2025 – SRCS volunteer Iman Abbas was killed by artillery shelling at the Sabreen open market in Omdurman.
- February 2025 – Two aid workers were killed in attacks by the RSF at the Zamzam camp.
- April 2025 - RSF fighters launched an attack on Zamzam camp and stormed a Relief International clinic, killing nine staff members, with two more staff later dying from injuries sustained in the attack.
- April 2025 – An RSF-allied militia abducted 40 aid workers and about 50 civilians who were evacuating the Zamzam camp.

== Syria ==
=== Syrian civil war (2011—2024) ===
- September 2011 – An attack on an ambulance by unknown assailants injured three rescuers and the wounded patient it was transporting in Homs, one of the rescuers, Hakam Drak Sibai, died due to his wounds.
- December 2011 – Two United Nations aid workers and a 3rd colleague were shot to death in Mataban, Hiran. The UN workers, who worked specifically for the World Food Programme, had been monitoring the distribution of food and camps for internally displaced peoples. United Nations operations in Mataban were temporarily suspended.
- August 2013 – Kayla Mueller was an American aid worker taken captive by ISIS in August 2013 in Aleppo, Syria, after leaving a Doctors Without Borders hospital. In 2015, she was killed in uncertain circumstances.
- September 2014 – British aid worker David Cawthorne Haines was kidnapped near the Atmeh refugee camp in Idlib Province near the Turkish border. He was seized along with an Italian aid worker and two Syrians who were later freed. Haines was apparently executed by a member of the Islamic State of Iraq and the Levant called Mohammed Emwazi.
- October 2014 – Alan Henning was a British aid worker with Al-Fatiha Global who was kidnapped and killed by Islamic State of Iraq and the Levant (ISIL) in a beheading video.
- September 2016 – A convoy of 31 trucks was attacked in Urum al-Kubra while unloading humanitarian aid organized by the UN and the Syrian Arab Red Crescent. According to the UN, Syrian government forces were responsible for the air strike, barrel bombs, and machine gun fire that killed 14 aid workers. The Syrian government denied involvement, blaming the attack on opposition forces.
- June 2019 – Two German aid workers working for CADUS e.V. were arrested in Qamischli, tortured in the Far' Falastine prison in Damascus, and held for 48 days by the Syrian military intelligence.
- February 2020 – Two Oxfam workers, Wissam Hazim and Adel al-Halabi, were killed, and one volunteer was injured in an attack by an armed group in Daraa province.
- December 2024 – Three local workers from Shafak and IYD were killed near Aleppo.

== Tajikistan ==
- December 1997 – A French aid worker, Karine Mane, was taken hostage and died two weeks later during a failed rescue mission by government forces.
- June 2001 – Kidnappers asked for the release of detained militants after taking a group of aid workers hostage.

== Tanzania ==
- June 2008 – An Australian working with foodwatershelter was killed during a robbery in Arusha.
- August 2009 — An Irish volunteer with the group Camara was killed during a suspected mugging in Zanzibar.

== Ukraine ==
=== Russian invasion of Ukraine (2022—present) ===
- January 2023 — 47-year-old New Zealand volunteer Dr. Andrew Bagshaw and 28-year-old British aid worker Chris Parry were killed by gunshot wounds to the head and body in the Soledar region.
- September 2023 — Emma Igual (Spanish) and Anthony Ihnat (Canadian) were killed when their vehicle suffered a "direct hit" in Ivanivske when attempting to reach Bakhmut. The incident left two other volunteers (German and Swedish nationals) injured, who were evacuated and treated outside of Ukraine.
- February 2023 — Pete Reed, the Ukraine country director for Global Outreach Doctors, was killed in a guided missile strike while helping to evacuate wounded civilians in Bakhmut.
- February 2024 – Two HEKS/EPER workers were killed and 4 injured when their vehicle was attacked in Beryslav, Khersonska Oblast.
- September 2024 – Three ICRC members were killed at an aid distribution site in Viroliubivka.

== Yemen ==
=== Yemeni crisis (2011—present) ===
- June 2012 – A Yemeni staff member of the ICRC was killed in an air strike by the Yemeni Armed Forces in Abyan. According to his family, he had been working on a colleague's release from kidnappers.
- May 2013 – Three ICRC staff were kidnapped while working in Abyan and released after a few days.
- September 2015 – Two Yemeni ICRC staff were killed after a gunman fired on their convoy heading to Sanaa. As a result, the ICRC temporarily paused travel in Yemen.
- December 2015– A French-Tunisian ICRC staff member was abducted on her way to work in Sanaa. A video of her requesting assistance from French President François Hollande and the ICRC was posted online a few months later. She was released in October 2016.
- June 2018— A Lebanese ICRC staff member was shot and killed by an unknown gunman in Taiz. He was traveling in a marked vehicle to work at a prison.
- December 2020– In the Aden airport attack, at least three ICRC staff were killed and three more injured.
- September 2023 — A Save the Children staff member was held incommunicado by the Houthis. He died a month later while in detention.
- June 2024 – OHCHR reported that over 60 Yemeni workers from the UN and other NGOs were arrested by the Houthis. They joined at least four UN workers who have been detained since 2021 and 2023. The Houthis claimed to have arrested members of an "American-Israeli spy network" and released videos of ten Yemeni people confessing to being spies. OHCHR said that one of the videos depicted a staff member and that the confession was forced.
- January 2025 – Seven UN workers have been detained after the US reclassified the Houthis as a foreign terrorist organizations. As a consequence of the detainment of their workers, the UN has suspended its movements into and within Houthi-held areas. On February 10, one member of the UN World Food Programme died in prison.

== See also ==
- World Humanitarian Day
