= Dalili =

Dalili (Persian: دلیلی) is a Persian surname. Notable people with the surname include:

- Raz Dalili (born 1959), peace educator in Afghanistan
- Raz Mohammed Dalili (born 1959), Governor of Paktia Province in Afghanistan
