= Gayle Williams =

South African-British aid worker

Gayle Williams (18 December 1973 – 20 October 2008) was an aid worker for SERVE Afghanistan of joint British and South African nationality. She was shot on her way to work in Kabul, Afghanistan by two men on a motorbike. Zabiullah Mujahid, a spokesman for the Taliban, claimed responsibility for her death and said she had been killed "because she was working for an organization which was preaching Christianity in Afghanistan".

== Education and early career ==
Williams was born in Rhodesia (now Zimbabwe) and raised in Empangeni, KwaZulu Natal. Her mother took her to live in Middlesbrough, England during her secondary school years, after which she went back to South Africa to study biokinetics and occupational therapy at the University of Zululand. Afterward, she returned to London to work with disabled and deprived children.

== Work in Afghanistan ==
Williams had been fascinated with Afghanistan, and worked with Afghan refugees in camps in Pakistan, starting to learn Dari and Pashto. She was determined to work in-country and was stationed in the Taliban heartland of Kandahar in 2006, working with disabled children, blind and deaf children, and children hurt and maimed by landmines and fighting in the country.

The charity SERVE Afghanistan is Christian in its beliefs, but denied that it tried to spread Christianity. Colleagues stressed that Williams was extremely careful not to try to convert Afghans.

She was well aware of the risks of working in Afghanistan. Some 4,000 people had been killed there in 2008, of whom one third were civilians. Taliban violence had been targeted against aid workers to spread fear and undermine the Government's claims to be bringing security. In April 2008, because of the danger to charity workers there, Serve recalled its staff from Kandahar to Kabul.

Williams had attended the funeral of a colleague a few weeks before her own death, and expressed a wish to be buried in the same Christian cemetery in Kabul if she were to die in Afghanistan. A friend recounted at her funeral that she said, "These bodies are only temporary. When I get to heaven I will have a new body."

== Responses to her death ==
On 20 October 2008, Williams was shot, at close range, while walking on a quiet street in Kabul.

Douglas Alexander, UK Secretary of State for International Development, condemned the murder: "Her killing was a callous and cowardly act by people who would take Afghanistan back to the dark days of the Taliban tyranny which scarred the country for so long."

Mike Lythe, head of Serve Afghanistan, said, "This is a tragedy... She knew the dangers, but Afghanistan is where she wanted to be." Following the killing, the organisation suspended its work in the country. The Foreign Office also updated its advice for people travelling to the country, stating that no part should be "considered immune from violence".

The London-based scholar Ziauddin Sardar described the killing as "another barbaric act in the name of Islam" and called on all Muslims to condemn the Taliban.

Following Williams' funeral, her mother and sister met President Hamid Karzai who wished to express his condolences. Her sister Karen Williams stated that they had forgiven the killers as Gayle would have done.

The family arranged a memorial service in London the week after. They asked for no flowers but for donations to be sent for the welfare of deprived Afghan children.

Responding to the murder of Gayle Williams, there were calls for Christians to end evangelism. However, a worldwide commission of evangelical Christian theologians, meeting in Bangkok on 23–25 October, reaffirmed the importance of holistic mission.

A "prayer walk" for Williams' family and colleagues was arranged for 8 November 2008 in London, stopping to pray outside embassies of countries where Christian believers face persecution.

The Centre for Safety and Development, which gives training to avoid attacks on humanitarian workers, notes that Williams trustfully walked the same route to work each day, and advises workers with NGOs to take more precautions.
