= Civilian =

Person who is not a member of a military

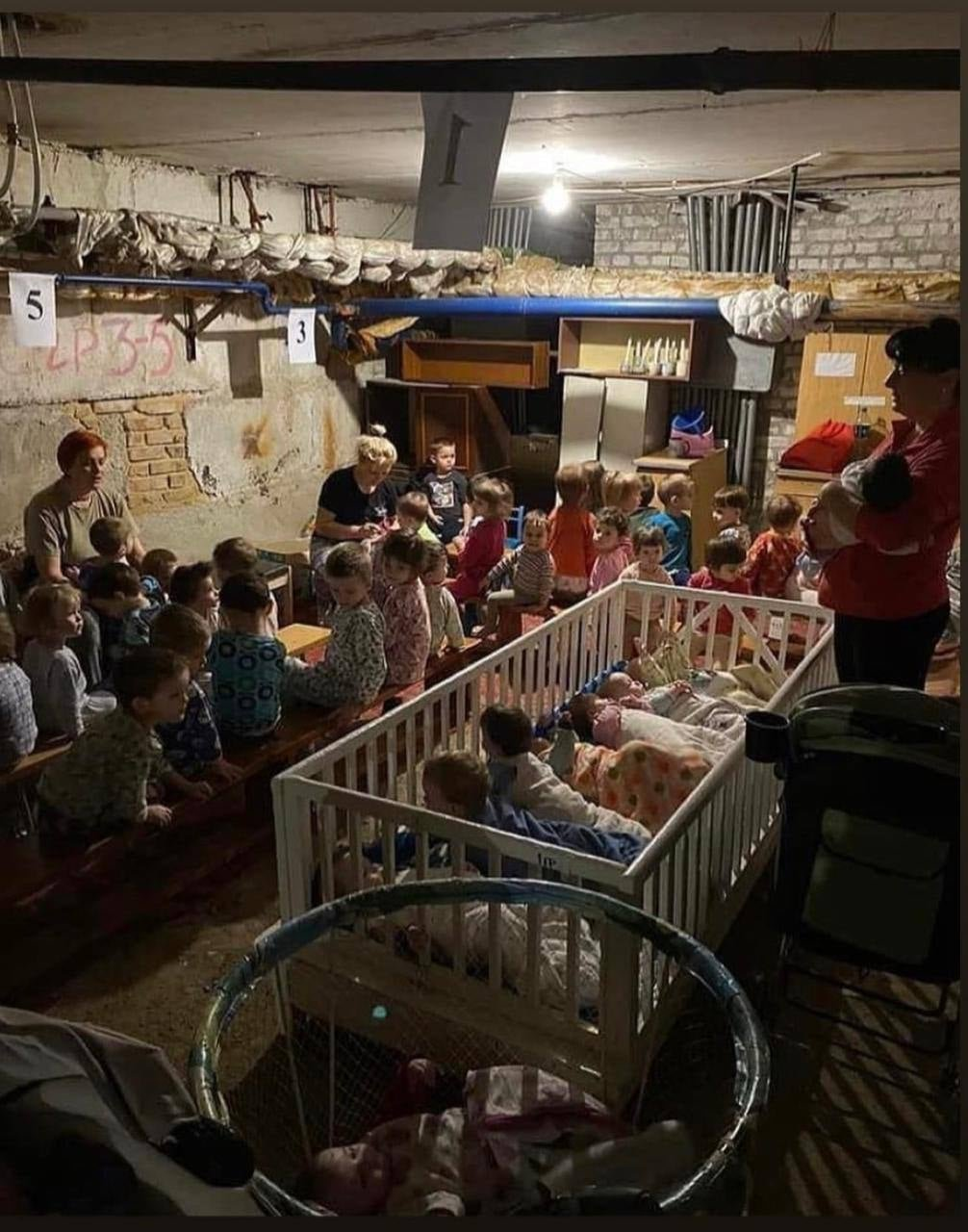
Ukrainian children in a shelter in Kropyvnytskyi, 1 March 2022, during the Russian invasion of Ukraine

In contemporary international humanitarian law or law of war, civilians are people who are not members of any armed force to the conflict. It is a war crime under the law of armed conflict to deliberately target civilians in military attacks, along with numerous other considerations to minimize civilian casualties during times of war. Civilians engaging in hostilities are considered unlawful combatants, and lose their protection from attack. Under the law of armed conflict, civilians may not be targeted by virtue of their status as persons not taking up arms against an enemy. Civilians who are not directly participating in hostilities are a type of non-combatant protected under the law of war including in international humanitarian law (IHL) treaties and conventions, as well as customary international law.

A civilian is slightly different from a non-combatant, because some non-combatants are not civilians (for example, military chaplains, or military personnel who are serving with a neutral country). Civilians in the territories of a party to an armed conflict are entitled to certain privileges under the customary laws of war and international treaties such as Geneva Convention IV. The privileges that they enjoy under international law depend on whether the conflict is a civil war or an international one.

== Etymology ==
The word "civilian" goes back to the late 14th century and is from Old French civilien. Civilian is believed to have been used to refer to non-combatants as early as 1829. The term "non-combatant" now refers to people in general who are not or are no longer actively engaging in hostilities in time of war, rather than just civilians.

== Legal usage in war ==
Specific mention of civilians as a protected class in international humanitarian law (IHL) did not occur until after World War II. The International Committee of the Red Cross (ICRC) Commentary on Geneva Convention IV of 1949 ("Relative to the Protection of Civilian Persons in Time of War") (1958) states that, "Every person in enemy hands must have some status under international law: he is either a prisoner of war and, as such, covered by Geneva Convention III, a civilian covered by Geneva Convention IV, or again, a member of the medical personnel of the armed forces who is covered by Geneva Convention I. There is no intermediate status; nobody in enemy hands can be outside the law. We feel that this is a satisfactory solution – not only satisfying to the mind, but also, and above all, satisfactory from the humanitarian point of view." The ICRC has expressed the opinion that, "If civilians directly engage in hostilities, they are considered "unlawful" or "unprivileged" combatants or belligerents (the treaties of humanitarian law do not expressly contain these terms). They may be prosecuted under the domestic law of the detaining state for such action."

Under Article 50(1)-(3) of Protocol I to the Geneva Conventions of 1977 (Additional Protocol I):

1. A civilian is any person who does not belong to one of the categories of persons referred to in Article 4A(1), (2), (3) and (6) of the Third [Geneva] Convention and in Article 43 of this Protocol. In case of doubt whether a person is a civilian, that person shall be considered to be a civilian.
2. The civilian population comprises all persons who are civilians.
3. The presence within the civilian population of individuals who do not come within the definition of civilians does not deprive the population of its civilian character.

Legal scholar Emily Crawford has noted that, "given the centrality of the concept of civilian status to the law of armed conflict, it is noteworthy that civilians do not have their own discrete definition; rather, civilians are defined in the negative in relation to combatants in the treaty law of armed conflict." No definition of the term "civilian" is contained in the Hague Regulations or the 1949 Geneva Conventions — including the Fourth Geneva Convention, which relates to the treatment of civilians in time of war. Protocol I to the Geneva Conventions of 1977 is the first IHL instrument to define the term.

The Commentary to Protocol I to the Geneva Conventions of 1977 has pointed out that anyone who is not a member of the armed forces and does not take part of hostilities in time of war is a civilian. Civilians cannot take part in armed conflict. Civilians are given protection under the Geneva Conventions and Protocols thereto. Article 50 defines civilians in international armed conflict as "all persons who are neither members of the armed forces of a party to the conflict nor participants in a levée en masse." Article 51 describes the protection that must be given to the civilian population and individual civilians.

Chapter III of Protocol I to the Geneva Conventions of 1977 regulates the targeting of civilian objects. Under Article 8(2)(b)(i) of the 1988 Rome Statute of the International Criminal Court (ICC Statute), "Intentionally directing attacks against the civilian population as such or against individual civilians not taking part in hostilities" is a war crime. Not all states have ratified Protocol I or the ICC Statute, but it is an accepted principle of IHL that the direct targeting of civilians is a breach of the customary laws of war and is binding on all combatants.

== Civilians in modern warfare ==
The actual position of the civilian in modern war remains problematic. It is complicated by a number of phenomena, including:

- The fact that many modern wars are essentially civil wars, in which the application of the laws of war is often difficult, and in which the distinction between combatants and civilians is particularly hard to maintain;
- Guerrilla warfare and terrorism, both of which tend to involve combatants assuming the appearance of civilians;
- The growth of doctrines of "effects-based war", under which there is less focus on attacking enemy combatants than on undermining the enemy regime's sources of power, which may include apparently civilian objects such as electrical power stations;
- The use of "lawfare", a term that refers to attempts to discredit the enemy by making its forces appear to be in violation of the laws of war, for example by attacking civilians who had been deliberately used as human shields;
- The term becomes ambiguous in societies that use widespread conscription, or otherwise "militarized societies," in which most adults have military training. This has been discussed with reference to the Israeli-Palestinian conflict.

Starting in the 1980s, it was often claimed that 90 percent of the victims of modern wars were non-combatants. These claims, though widely believed, are not supported by detailed examination of the evidence, particularly that relating to wars (such as those in former Yugoslavia and in Afghanistan) that are central to the claims.

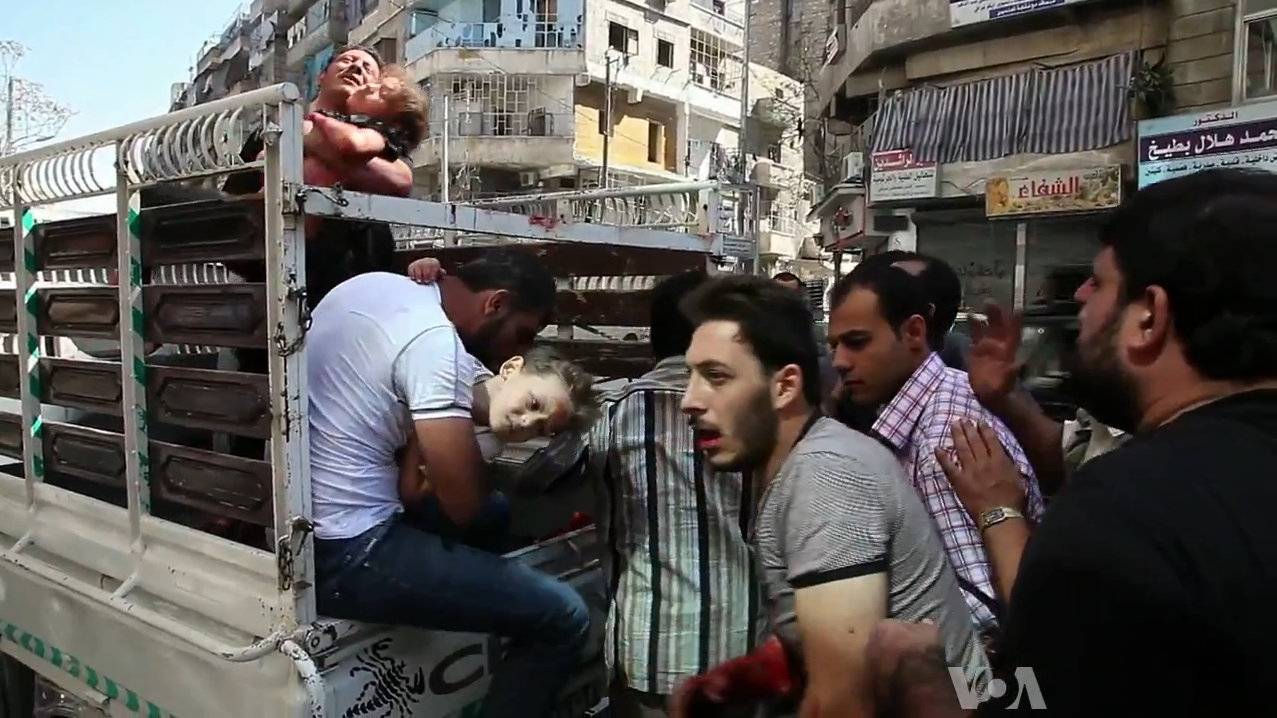
Wounded civilians arrive at a hospital in Aleppo during the Syrian civil war, October 2012

In the opening years of the 21st century, despite the many problems associated with it, the legal category of the civilian has been the subject of considerable attention in public discourse, in the media and at the United Nations, and in justification of certain uses of armed force to protect endangered populations. It has "lost none of its political, legal and moral salience."

Although it is often assumed that civilians are essentially passive onlookers of war, sometimes they have active roles in conflicts. These may be quasi-military, as when in November 1975 the Moroccan government organized the "green march" of civilians to cross the border into the former Spanish colony of Western Sahara to claim the territory for Morocco — all at the same time as Moroccan forces entered the territory clandestinely. In addition, and without necessarily calling into question their status as non-combatants, civilians sometimes take part in campaigns of nonviolent civil resistance as a means of opposing dictatorial rule or foreign occupation: sometimes such campaigns happen at the same time as armed conflicts or guerrilla insurrections, but they are usually distinct from them as regards both their organization and participation.

Officials directly involved in the maiming of civilians are conducting offensive combat operations and do not qualify as civilians.

== Civilian protection under international humanitarian law ==
International humanitarian law (IHL), also known as the law of war and the law of armed conflict, codifies treaties and conventions, signed and enforced by participating states, which serve to protect civilians during intrastate and interstate conflict. In the mid-19th century, governments began to "construct a body of international law that attempted to codify customary protections for civilians."

Even for non-treaty participants, it is customary for international law to still apply. Additionally, IHL adheres to the principles of distinction, proportionality, and necessity; which apply to the protection of civilians in armed conflict. Although, despite the United Nations deploying military forces to protect civilians, it lacks formal policies or military manuals addressing exactly these efforts. The UN Security Council Report No 4: Protection of Civilians in Armed Conflict provides further evidence of the need for protection of civilians.

The four Geneva Conventions of 1949 on war victims "were the result of almost four years of international negotiation and effort led by the International Committee of the Red Cross (ICRC). The ICRC wanted the conventions to codify further the rights of war victims and the responsibilities that belligerent nations had to them." "The fourth convention introduced an entirely new body of law on the protection of civilians in time of war."

An international conference in 1977 completed drafting two additional protocols to the Geneva Conventions of 1949. "The first and second protocols, relating to the protection of victims of international and non-international armed conflicts, respectively." "In a nutshell, Protocol I prohibits direct or indiscriminate attacks against civilians and requires military forces to take all reasonable measures to avoid unnecessary civilian casualties." 174 states are party to this Protocol as of 2015.

Under Article 51(1)–(3), (7) and (8) of Protocol I to the Geneva Conventions of 1977:

- 1. The civilian population and individual civilians shall enjoy general protection against dangers arising from military operations. To give effect to this protection, the following rules, which are additional to other applicable rules of international law, shall be observed in all circumstances.
- 2. The civilian population as such, as well as individual civilians, shall not be the object of attack. Acts or threats of violence the primary purpose of which is to spread terror among the civilian population are prohibited.
- 3. Civilians shall enjoy the protection afforded by this Section, unless and for such time as they take a direct part in hostilities. ...
- 7. The presence or movements of the civilian population or individual civilians shall not be used to render certain points or areas immune from military operations, in particular in attempts to shield military objectives from attacks or to shield, favour or impede military operations. The Parties to the conflict shall not direct the movement of the civilian population or individual civilians in order to attempt to shield military objectives from attacks or to shield military operations.
- 8. Any violation of these prohibitions shall not release the Parties to the conflict from their legal obligations with respect to the civilian population and civilians, including the obligation to take the precautionary measures provided for in Article 57.

=== Civilian objects ===
Civilian objects are "all objects which are not military objectives."

== Civilian protection in the UN Security Council ==
Recognizing that large-scale civilian insecurity threatens international peace and stability, the UN aims to establish the means of protecting civilians and thereby work to ensure regional stability. Through the UN Security Council Report No 4, first published in 2008, the UN offers ways to support civilian protections in both intra- and inter-state conflict with a goal of encouraging regional states to police their own conflicts (such as the African Union policing African conflicts). Similarly, the UN Secretary-General Kofi Annan reminded UN member states that they have common interests in protecting African civilians through a shared "commitments to human security, and its rationale of indivisibility of peace and security."

Through a series of resolutions (1265, 1296, 1502, 1674 and 1738) and presidential statements the UN Security Council addresses:

- compliance with international humanitarian law and relevant human rights law, accountability for violations and humanitarian access;
- the role of UN peacekeeping operations or other UN-mandated missions;
- protection of specific groups;
- the impact of small arms; and
- regional cooperation.

The Security Council is now involved in the protection of civilians in five main areas of action.

- It reinforces general norms — in particular the rules of international humanitarian law.
- It uses its Chapter VII powers to mandate either UN peacekeeping missions or regional organizations or groups of member states to take measures including the use of force to protect civilians.
- It can develop middle ground using its Chapter V, VI and VIII powers to influence parties to conflict in country-specific situations to observe protection norms.
- It uses its Chapter VI powers to try to prevent or limit the outbreak of armed conflict through mediation and other initiatives.
- Finally, the Council can hold parties accountable for violations of international humanitarian law by imposing targeted measures, establishing commissions of inquiry, authorizing ad hoc tribunals or referring situations to the International Criminal Court (ICC)."

In response to presidential statements and previous subcommittee work, the UN Security Council held a meeting in January 2009, specifically to address the protection of civilians within the context of the IHL. While no specific outcome followed this meeting, it did lead to the production of a 10-year assessment of Council actions since the passing of resolution 1265 in 1999.

In addition to the UN treaties, regional treaties have also been established, such as the African Union Constitutive Act Article 4(h) which also outlines the protection of civilians and "affords the Union a right to forcibly intervene in one of its member states in "grave circumstances", namely war crimes, genocide and crimes against humanity." This is proposed to indicate the African Union will no longer stand by to watch atrocities happen within the Union. As described by Said Djinnit (AU's Commissioner for Peace and Security) in 2004, "Africans cannot [...] watch the tragedies developing in the continent and say it is the UN's responsibility or somebody else's responsibility. We have moved from the concept of non-interference to non-indifference. We cannot, as Africans, remain indifferent to the tragedy of our people" (IRIN News 2004). Although Article 4(h), while drafted, has not been activated, which raises the question of the AU's willingness to intervene in situations of "grave circumstance."

Regardless of the lead organization (UN, AU, other) "there is clearly a risk involved for international organizations that in assuming a complicated security role such as civilian protection, they may raise expectations among local populations that cannot be met, usually not even by large-scale peace operations with a comprehensive political component, supported by high force levels, overall professionalism, and the political stamina to stay present long-term. The disappointing outcomes, in Africa and elsewhere, have led some to criticize the way in which the decentralization policies have been implemented (MacFarlane and Weiss 1992; Berman 1998; Boulden 2003)."

Under the 1977 Protocol I Additional to the Geneva Conventions, civilians are entitled to protection against direct attack unless and as long as they take a direct part in hostilities. Direct participation in hostilities refers to specific acts carried out by individuals. Civilians lose their immunity from direct attack when, and only so long as, they are directly participating in hostilities. When unclear as to a person's civilian status, there is a presumption that that person is a civilian. One's presence within a population of individuals who do not come within the definition of civilians does not deprive the person of their civilian character. Customary international law puts the onus on an attacking party to do everything feasible to verify that the objectives to be attacked are neither civilians nor civiliab objects and are not subject to special protection. Military objectives can be directly targeted, meaning that they offer a definite military advantage. Under Article 28 of Geneva Convention IV, it is prohibited to use civilians to render military objectives immune from attack. This prohibition includes human shields under customary international law and Article 51(7) of Additional Protocol I.

== Civilians in domestic law ==
Most nations clearly distinguish military authorities from the civil administration via the national constitution; or else in statute law where no codified constitution exists. This usually serves to place control of military forces under the presiding civilian government. "Civilian" is often not defined explicitly but is a "negative definition" where anyone who is not designated as military personnel is (by default) a civilian. In keeping with IHL, this offers no intermediary status.

Involvement and jurisdiction of the armed forces in civil affairs varies from nation to nation.

In France and Italy, the National Gendarmerie and Carabinieri are military agencies permanently tasked to supporting domestic civilian law-enforcement, usually focussed on serious organised crime and counter-terrorism. Until 2008, the South African Commando System (a volunteer militia within the South African Army) assisted the Police Service in rural areas until they were replaced by specialised Police units. Section 201 of the South African constitution allows military forces to assist Police only with Presidential approval.

The British military does not intervene in law enforcement matters other than by exceptional ministerial approval. During the 1980 Iranian Embassy Siege, the Metropolitan Police were able to request military support and the Prime Minister approved deployment of the SAS. Unarmed military personnel routinely deploy in support for natural disasters, bomb disposal, etc. under MACA. In 1969 the British Army was deployed to Northern Ireland under Operation Banner to support the local police in the wake of rioting. This deployment inflamed local tensions, with the Provisional IRA launching a guerilla campaign from 1970 to 1997, during which time controversial actions such as Operation Demetrius took place, as well as atrocities such as the Bloody Sunday massacre. Operation Banner ultimately lasted 37 years, formally ending in 2007 and becoming the British Armed Forces' longest continuous operation. The many problems faced (and arguably caused by) Operation Banner have been influential in policy-making and the reluctance to deploy military forces domestically in anything other than exceptional circumstances (usually relating to serious terrorist threats).

By contrast, German law prohibits entirely the peacetime intervention of military forces within Germany in armed roles. Military personnel may only be deployed in unarmed roles such as disaster relief. This was found to be deeply restrictive during the 1972 Munich massacre when army snipers could not be deployed to assist Munich Police. GSG 9 was later formed within the Bundesgrenzschutz to provide an armed tactical capability within the civilian law enforcement structure.

In the US, the 1878 Posse Comitatus Act forbids the use of the US Army for law enforcement purposes without the approval of Congress. A 2013 directive clarified that this included the Navy, Air Force and Marine Corp. In practice there are many nuances to this. The most notable being that the US Coast Guard operates under the U.S. Department of Homeland Security during peacetime but can be transferred to the U.S. Department of the Navy and rendered "military" during times of war. The US National Guard are organised at a State level and under mixed control. Under Title 32, State Governors may deploy National Guard personnel in support of civilian law enforcement - Posse Comitatus would only apply to personnel activated under Title 10 and operating under federal control.

== Non-military usage ==
When used as a modifier, it can refer to a non-military object, such as "civilian clothes".

In the United States, "civilian oversight" or "citizen oversight" is used to distinguish external committees (typically monitoring police conduct on behalf of civil administrations and taxpayers) from the internal management structure.

Policing traditions influenced by the Peelian principles regard police officers as "citizens in uniform" rather than as a separate military force.

The term is also used informally to refer to individuals outside a particular group, profession, or community.

==== Organized crime ====
"Civilian" is also used to refer to someone who is not affiliated with an organized crime group, particularly in neighborhoods or regions where affiliation is common. Being a civilian does not necessarily mean being uninvolved, such as in relation to protection rackets operated by Italian-American Mafia groups when business owners would pay for protection and/or be required to bribe an area's controlling crime family. Civilians are generally considered off-limits and cannot be targets of violence, even if the individual is a relation of affiliated members.

== See also ==
- Law of war, also known as international humanitarian law (IHL)
- Non-combatant
- Distinction (law)
- Precautionary principle
- Proportionality (law)
- Geneva Convention IV (1949)
- Protocol I to the Geneva Conventions (1977)
- Privatus
