= Tom Little (optometrist) =

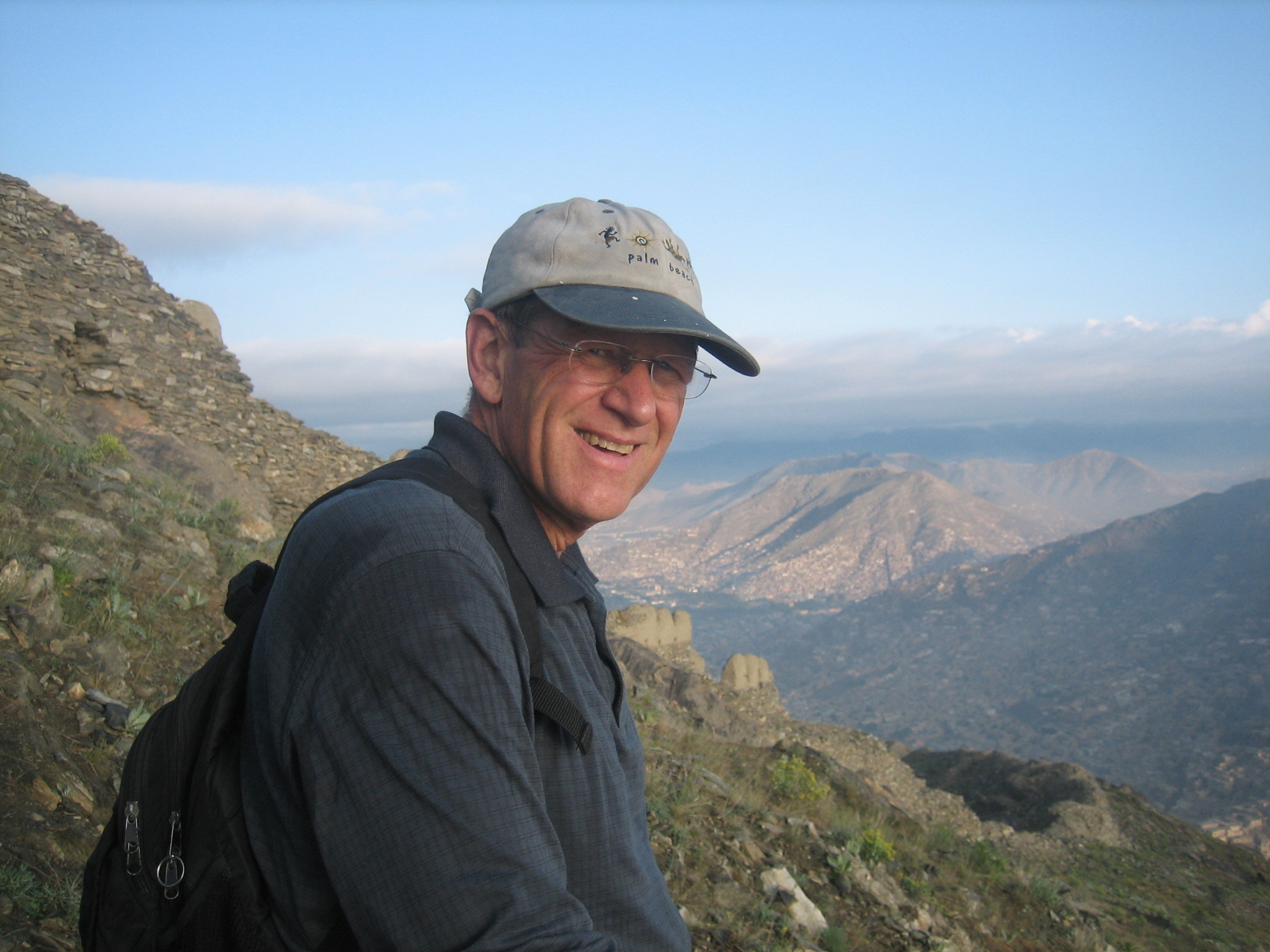
Tom Little

Thomas E. Little (March 20, 1949 – August 5, 2010) was an American Christian optometrist from Kinderhook, New York. Little was the leader of an International Assistance Mission team in Afghanistan that was attacked in the 2010 Badakhshan massacre; he and nine other members of his team were murdered. He is a posthumous recipient of the Presidential Medal of Freedom.

== Biography ==
The son of an ophthalmologist, Little attended Ichabod Crane High School in Valatie, New York, where he dated his future wife, Libby. The couple's three daughters were educated at Woodstock School in India.

In 1976, Little traveled to Afghanistan. Although only intending to stay there for several months, Little ultimately spent the next 34 years building up the country's eye care services during successive regime changes. Little spoke Dari fluently. He was involved in National Organization of Ophthalmic Rehabilitation Eye Project, and he trained Afghans in optical care.

In August 2010, Little's medical relief team was attacked by masked gunmen in the Kuran wa Munjan District of Badakhshan Province while returning from Nuristan to Kabul. The team had spent two weeks traveling between remote villages on foot and providing medical care. Ten members of the team, including six Americans, were murdered. The Taliban took responsibility for the attack, claiming that the Christian-sponsored team was attempting to proselytize Muslims. (The International Assistance Mission, the nonprofit group that coordinated Little's August 2010 trip, denied the accusation.) Little's body was found on August 7, 2010. At Little's memorial service, his friend, Rev. James Hale, said, "'When Tom believed in Christ and trusted in Christ it wasn’t just something in his head'". On August 21, 2010, Little's body was interred at the British Cemetery in Kabul, Afghanistan.

Little was posthumously awarded the Presidential Medal of Freedom by President Barack Obama on February 15, 2011. Obama called Little a "'humanitarian in the true sense of the word'". Little was also posthumously recognized as the 2010 International Optometrist of the Year by the World Council of Optometrists.
