= Health Care In Danger =

Red Cross campaign

Campaign logo

Health Care In Danger is a campaign organized by the International Committee of the Red Cross that highlights violent attacks on patients, healthcare workers, and healthcare facilities in conflict zones.

The campaign was launched in 2011 with the publication of a report detailing attacks on healthcare facilities and workers and analyzing the health impacts for communities as healthcare workers flee.

== Background ==
Global appreciation about the neutral and impartial role that humanitarian aid organizations take in situations of armed conflict diminished in the aftermath of the September 11 attacks.

== Launch ==
The International Committee of the Red Cross launched the Health Care In Danger campaign in 2011 with the publication of a report detailing 655 attacks on healthcare facilities in sixteen countries, noting them as breaches of the Geneva Conventions.

The report explained how attacks on healthcare facilities and healthcare workers in conflict zones reduced the ability of humanitarian aid organizations to deliver humanitarian health services to people with healthcare needs. The report included the slogan "Violence against health care must end".

The campaign aimed to improve the delivery of healthcare in conflict zones and other contexts, and to improve protections afforded to health care staff, facilities, and patients, during conflict and other emergencies. It cites examples including how one attack in Somalia prevented 150,000 medical consultations per year, and calculated that the consequences of violence against healthcare workers in the Democratic Republic of the Congo results in excess mortality of 40,000 people per month. Other examples include the killing of 628 healthcare workers in Iraq and the fleeing of 18,000 doctors in the aftermath of the US-led invasion in 2003.

The report documented that 33% of the attacks were undertaken by armed forces of sovereign states and 36.9% of attacks were done by non-state armed groups. NGOs were the target of 34.5% of attacks, 25.6% of targets were locally run healthcare facilities, and 16.8% of targets were part of the Red Cross movement.

The campaign includes workshops between the International Committee of the Red Cross, the Canadian Red Cross, the Iranian Red Crescent, the Norwegian Red Cross, organized to collect ideas to improve the safety and protection of healthcare workers, facilities and patients.

== COVID-19 pandemic ==
The Health Care In Danger campaign leadership reported to The Lancet in 2020 that there were 611 attacks on healthcare workers and facilities in between 1 February 2020 and 31 July 2020 in the context of the COVID-19 pandemic. 67% of the 611 incidents were physical attacks on healthcare staff.

== Other campaigns ==
Since the 2011 launch of the campaign, which was the first of its kind, other organizations have launched similar campaigns. Médecins Sans Frontières run a comparable campaign called Medical Care Under Fire and Physicians for Human Rights document attacks on medical doctors and health facilities during the Syrian civil war. Humanitarian Outcomes compile the Aid Worker Security Database, which documents attacks on humanitarian workers.

== Leadership ==
- As of 2020, Maciej Polkowski was the head of the campaign.
- Robin Coupland M.D. was the lead author of the 2011 report.
