= 2007 murder of Red Cross workers in Sri Lanka =

Coordinates: 6.934°N 79.842°E

Murder of Red Cross workers
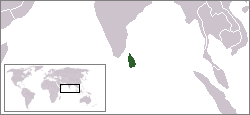
- Location of Sri Lanka
- Location: Colombo, Sri Lanka
- Date: June 1, 2007 (+6 GMT)
- Target: Sri Lankan Tamil civilians
- Attack type: Firing
- Weapon: Guns
- Deaths: 2

Murder of Red Cross workers in Sri Lanka took place on June 3, 2007 when two minority Sri Lankan Tamil aid workers were detained by two men claiming to be policemen on June 1, 2007. Their bodies were later found in Ratnapura (about 95 kilometers away from the capital).

== Incident ==
Two staff members of the Sri Lanka Red Cross, 39-year-old Sinnarajah Shanmuganathan, and 28-year-old Karthigesu Chandramohan, had come to Sri Lanka's capital Colombo for a training program in Tsunami work . According to Mr Vasantharajah, Head of Sri Lanka Red Cross in Batticaloa, both were part of a group of six aid workers sent from Batticaloa who had been sent on May 30, 2007 to Colombo.

After completing the training program on May 30 and June 1, the group had gone to the main Fort Railway station in the Capital Colombo at 6:30 p.m. Friday to take the 7:15 p.m. train to Batticaloa. A group of men, who were dressed in civilian clothes and claimed to be policemen, had asked to examine the group's national identity cards. They then abducted Shanmuganathan and Chandramohan, transporting them in a white van for "questioning," according to the testimonies of the other four members of the group. Shanmuganathan had joined the Red Cross in 1997, and Chandramohan had been working with the Red Cross since 1999.

== Reactions ==
=== Red Cross ===
The Red Cross said it filed a complaint with the Fort Police, and a separate complaint with the Inspector General of Police immediately after hearing about the incident.

On the information that some unidentified bodies had been found at the Dumbara Estate in Kiriella, the Red Cross officials went to the site and identified the bodies.

"The movement calls upon the Sri Lankan authorities to carry out an immediate and comprehensive investigation into the killings,"

Sri Lanka Red Cross Director General Nevil Nanayakkara said in a statement:

"The movement reminds the parties to the conflict that murder is prohibited under international humanitarian law, and that they must respect the work of humanitarian agencies and refrain from any acts that might jeopardise humanitarian staff or activities."

=== Sri Lankan government ===
According to Kiriella Police Inspector the victims might have been killed elsewhere before their bodies were dumped in the estate. There were other bodies dumped in the same location on an earlier incident. Police chief Victor Perera said five police teams had been appointed to investigate into the incident.

Sri Lankan Human Rights Minister Mahinda Samarasinghe speaking to the Daily Mirror yesterday said the government strongly condemned the double murder of the Red Cross employees. Minister Samarasinghe stated:

"Government strongly condemns this crime which appears to have been carried out to discredit the government. This type of abductions and killings are totally against the government policy. We are determined to get to the bottom of this story"

=== Others ===
United Kingdom condemned the abduction and killing of two Red Cross workers in Sri Lanka. The British High Commissioner Dominick Chilcott was quoted as saying,

" recent incidents show how serious the country's breakdown in law and order has become"

. He was further quoted as,

" Targeting people who work for the Red Cross, an organization renowned for its strict neutrality and determination to assist those in need irrespective of their origins, is particularly contemptible"

. Human Rights Watch, an international human rights group, has said that since violence escalated, Sri Lanka has faced

"lawlessness of epidemic proportions, with increased abductions, killings and forced disappearances"

Civil Monitoring Committee, a group that has campaigned against abductions reported that apart from those killed from direct fighting and crossfire, 140 people have been abducted from capital Colombo in 2006 and 18 were later found dead. Hundreds more have been forcibly taken away by unknown men in the north and east, where the fighting is concentrated.

== See also ==
- 2006 Trincomalee massacre of NGO workers
- Al-Shifa ambulance airstrike
- Attacks on humanitarian workers
