= Aid Worker Security Database =

The Aid Worker Security Database (AWSD) is a project of the international research group Humanitarian Outcomes. Funded by USAID, it records major incidents, from 1997 to present, of attacks on humanitarian workers worldwide. As cited in the New York Times, "it is widely regarded as an authoritative reference for aid organisations and governments in assessing trends in security threats." Since its inception in 2005 as the first fully comprehensive compilation of this data, the AWSD has been a source of quantitative evidence on matters related to the security of humanitarian operations in conflict, referenced in policy debates and cited in official United Nations statements, United Nations General Assembly resolutions, United Nations Security Council documents, and reports of the Secretary-General of the United Nations.

The data, which is openly available for searching and downloading, is regularly relied upon by other databases in the humanitarian crisis analysis community, such as ACLED. It has also been cited in US Congressional and State Department documents and UK Parliament reports, as well as by major media outlets including: The Associated Press, BBC News, The New York Times, Reuters, The Economist, Al Jazeera, El Pais, The Guardian, The Irish Times, La Figaro, Le Monde, Scientific American, Christian Science Monitor, and National Public Radio.

== History ==
The AWSD was developed by Humanitarian Outcomes partners Abby Stoddard and Adele Harmer, then at New York University's Center on International Cooperation and the Overseas Development Institute's Humanitarian Policy Group, respectively. The first published research using this data was a 2006 report titled Providing Aid in Insecure Environments, by Stoddard, Harmer, and a colleague, Katherine Haver. This report provided statistical analysis, finding attacks on aid workers worldwide nearly doubled between 1997 and 2005 in absolute terms, and rose by 20 percent in terms of per capita rates.

== Data ==
From the website, customizable search options allow for users of the data to download as csv files with relevantly sorted information. An API is also available. The online dataset contains security incidents (attacks) from 1997 to present, and is updated in real time.

=== Parameters ===
Attacks against aid workers recorded in the AWSD are defined as "major", including intentional killings, kidnappings, serious sexual assault/rape, and attacks causing serious injury. The definition of an aid worker is also limited to those working in emergency contexts to provide humanitarian relief (as opposed to political, developmental or other assistance). The aid worker victims are employees, or contractors and consultants, of not-for-profit aid agencies. All organisations and victim names are kept confidential and not included in the public data. This choice was made because victim information is not available for all incidents, and those close to the victims may not wish to have the names published. The information that is publicly available for each incident is as follows:

- Date of incident
- Location (country/province/city) and geocodes
- Gender
- Aid organisation affiliation (UN/Red Cross/NGO/Other)
- National or international staff
- Type of intentional act (killing/wounding/kidnapping/rape)
- Type of violence ( e.g. assault, shooting, IED, aerial bombardment)
- Attack situation (e.g. ambush, armed incursion, individual attack)
- Perpetrator (e.g. non-state armed group, police, criminal)
- Public description: who, what, when, where, why (when available)

=== Sources ===
The AWSD engages with a variety of sources to ensure completeness of the dataset. Each incident publicly lists one of the following sources;

- Media: using a media filtering tool developed as an internet data scraper for Humanitarian Outcomes
- Official report: provided directly by regional and global security entities/consortiums, or by aid organisations official reports/press releases
- Focal point: security personnel within organisations affected by an incident against a staff member. (Victim self-reporting is also put in this category)

=== Verification ===
Annually, all incidents from the previous year are comprehensively verified with agencies who work in the humanitarian sector, to ensure all the details are accurately reflected in the database. The team works with 100 NGO/INGO and UN agencies per year in order to confirm, update, and collect additional incident data, and to source additional incidents that may not have been previously captured via other means. Each year the verified numbers are presented in the Aid Worker Security Report, which is published on the Humanitarian Outcomes website and publicly available. This verified data also supports and helps define the theme of the annual report, which is on a topic that is significant to the humanitarian community or highlighted by trends supported by the data. An easily digestible one-page fact sheet, Figures at Glance, is also usually published in August and highlights the findings from the previous years verified data.

== Publications ==
- Aid Worker Security Report 2019: Speakable - Addressing sexual violence and gendered risks in humanitarian aid
- Aid Worker Security Database Infographic
- Figures 2018.pdf Aid Worker Security Report 2018: Figures at a glance
- Aid Worker Security Report 2017: Behind the attacks: A look at the perpetrators of violence against aid workers
- Aid Worker Security Report 2016: Figures at a glance

== Citations ==
=== Media ===
- "Killing of aid worker in Syria part of 'disturbing trend'" UN News 2019
- "Red Cross says health and aid workers face unabated attacks" Associated Press 2019
- "Taliban Target Aid Groups, in an Ominous Turn in Afghanistan" The New York Times 2019
- "Attacks on aid workers rise in Central African Republic" Reuters 2018
- "Aid worker deaths: the numbers tell the story" UN OCHA 2018

=== Books and articles ===
- Necessary Risks: Professional Humanitarianism and Violence against Aid Workers; Stoddard, Abby
- Becoming an International Aid Worker; Reis, Chen; Bernath, Tania
- Personal Security: A Guide for International Travellers; Spencer, Tanya
- Humanitarian NGOs, (In)Security and Identity: Epistemic Communities and Security Governance; Schneiker, Andrea
- Aid in Danger: The Perils and Promise of Humanitarianism; Fast, Larissa
- Ghosts of Afghanistan: The Haunted Battleground; Steele, Jonathan
- "Neglect and Failures of Human Security in Humanitarian Settings: Challenges and Recommendations" Macpherson, Robert; Burkle, Frederick M

== See also ==
- Health Care In Danger, 2011 report and campaign by ICRC
