= Global Dental Relief =

- Type: 501(c)3 tax-deductible charitable organization
- Industry: Dentistry
- Founded: 2001
- Founder: Laurie Mathews; Andrew Holecek, DDS
- Headquarters: Denver, CO, United States
- Area served: Nepal, India, Mexico, Guatemala, Kenya, Cambodia, United States
- Website: Official Website

Global Dental Relief volunteers have been working since 2001 to bring dental care to children overseas. GDR works in seven countries— Nepal, India, Guatemala, Mexico, Kenya, Cambodia and the US. GDR previously provided free dental care in Vietnam as well. Since 2001, 4,000 dedicated volunteers served over 240,000 children with $50.6 million in donated dental care in these six countries.

GDR's mission is to engage diverse groups of dental professionals and non-dental volunteers to bring free dental care to children in need throughout the world. Currently GDR has 21 options in seven countries to volunteer in a five or six-day clinic providing preventive care and oral health education to impoverished children.

Volunteers pay their own travel expenses, and GDR arranges accommodations, sightseeing, meals, and clinic set up in advance of each trip.

== History ==
Global Dental Relief (GDR) was founded in 2001 as the Himalayan Dental Relief Project by former Director of Colorado State Parks, Laurie Mathews and Andrew Holecek, DDS. While on sabbatical in Nepal, they recognized the need for dental care in a country which, at the time, had 120 dentists for a population approaching 24 million. Clinics began at the Shree Mangal Dvip School in Kathmandu, Nepal, and continue at this location to the present day. What started with a single makeshift clinic, serving children in the outskirts of Kathmandu, Nepal, has branched out to the mountains of India, the Guatemalan Highlands, Chogoria, Kenya, the Yucatan Peninsula of Mexico, the Angkor region of northwest Cambodia, and a domestic location in Jenkins, Kentucky.

Since its beginning, Global Dental Relief has grown from 27 volunteers in 2002 to hundreds of dedicated volunteers joining annually — dentists, hygienists and general volunteers. Global Dental Relief volunteers now hosts 30 trips a year serving children with donated dental care and education – bringing dental care and hope to children in need.

GDR's work continues under Kim Troggio, who serves as the director of Global Dental Relief, while Laurie serves on the emeritus Board and devotes her time to GDR small adventure clinics in the field.

== Recent updates ==
=== 2023 highlights ===
In 2023, 22,382 children visited GDR clinics in seven countries, receiving $5.4 million in donated dental care from GDR volunteers. These children learn the basic skills of toothbrushing and overall oral health.

Many children globally live without access to care. Small cavities grow into serious decay and infection, affecting a child's ability to sleep, eat or pay attention in school. Global Dental Relief volunteers work to restore children to dental health and bright smiles. Children attend clinic class by class, and receive all necessary dental care, oral health instruction and a new toothbrush. Children return to clinic every two years.
