= Raz Dalili =

Raz Mohammed Dalili
- Born: October 1, 1959 (age 66); Ghazni, Afghanistan
- Education: Kabul University
- Occupations: Social Change Acitivist; Entrepreneur
- Organization: Sanayee Development Organization (SDO)

Raz Mohammad Dalili (Afghan, Tajik: 1 October 1959), born in Ghazni province of Afghanistan, is a peace educator in Afghanistan. In 1990, he founded the Sanayee Development Organization to support peace-building efforts for Afghan refugees in Peshawar, Pakistan. He is the recipient of the 2015 El-Hibri Peace Education Prize, which is awarded every year to an outstanding scholar, activist or policy-maker by the El-Hibri Foundation based in Washington, D.C.

== Career as Activist ==
Dalili served the Afghan society as a teacher, human rights activist, peace builder and educator. In 1990, he founded the NGO called Sanayee Development Organization (SDO) to support peace-building efforts for Afghan refugees in Peshawar. In 1992, he expanded its service and relocated to Afghanistan with the mission to reduce violence and promote peace and social cohesion in Afghan communities. Dalili also established libraries open to both men and women. In 1994, he established Sadia primary school that has 600 male and female students. His peace building efforts among children led him to initiate the monthly children’s magazine “Rangeen Kaman” (Rainbow). The magazine has a monthly circulation of 9,000; it is published in Dari and Pashto languages.

In 1998, Raz Dalili developed a peace education curriculum from 1st to 12th grade of national schools. In 2003, this curriculum was introduced in 47 schools for more than 35000 Afghan refugee students in Peshawar, Pakistan. He also implemented peace education in 105 schools in Balkh, Faryab, Samangan and [Kabul] provinces of Afghanistan.

== Personal life ==
Raz Dalili was born into a poor family in 1959. His father was an illiterate landless farmer and mother was literate who always encouraged him. Dalili married Tahera Dalili in 1982. They have four sons.

== Education ==
Dalili went to Ghazi High School and was awarded a university degree in economics from Kabul University in 1984.

== Publications and films ==
- "Bare Foot" (2012) by Raz Dalili produced by Sanayee Development Organization
- "Peace is Life" by Raz Dalili and produced by Sanayee Development Organization
- "Devil and Angel" or "Deow Wa Pari" by Sanayee Development Organization
- "Khala Falbinal" by Sanayee Development Organization
- "Rangeen Kaman"- children's magazine
