= Sanayee Development Organization =

Sanayee Development Organization (SDO) is an Afghan non-governmental organization headquartered in Kabul, Afghanistan. SDO's programs focus on community-based peace building, education, civil society development and community health in 12 provinces of Afghanistan.

== History ==
In 1990, Raz Dalili founded the Sanayee Development Organization (SDO) to support peace building efforts for Afghan refugees in Peshawar, Pakistan. In 1992, he expanded its service and relocated to Afghanistan with the mission to reduce violence and promote peace and social cohesion in Afghan communities.
