= United Nations Security Council Resolution 1502 =

UN Security Council Resolution 1502
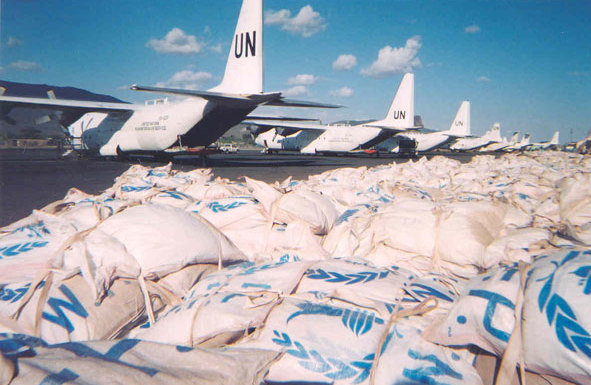
- United Nations aid delivery
- Date: 26 August 2003
- Meeting no.: 4,814
- Code: S/RES/1502 (Document)
- Subject: Protection of United Nations personnel, associated personnel and humanitarian personnel in conflict zones
- Voting summary: 15 voted for; None voted against; None abstained
- Result: Adopted

Security Council composition
- Permanent members: China; France; Russia; United Kingdom; United States
- Non-permanent members: Angola; Bulgaria; Chile; Cameroon; Germany; Guinea; Mexico; Pakistan; Spain; Syria

United Nations Security Council resolution 1502, adopted unanimously on 26 August 2003, after recalling resolutions 1265 (1999), 1296 (2000) and 1460 (2003), the council condemned violence against humanitarian workers and called upon all states to ensure that such incidents did not remain unpunished.

The vote on the resolution, proposed by Mexico, was delayed due to opposition from the United States concerning the inclusion of language relating to the International Criminal Court, which the latter did not recognise; references to the court were later removed.

== Resolution ==
=== Observations ===
The Security Council reiterated its primary responsibility for the maintenance of international peace and security, and to ensure respect for international humanitarian law. It welcomed General Assembly resolutions concerning the protection of United Nations and humanitarian personnel. At the same time, United Nations and humanitarian personnel were asked to respect the laws of the country in which they were operating.

The preamble of the resolution also emphasised the existence of restrictions against attacks directed at United Nations peacekeeping personnel or humanitarian personnel, which constituted war crimes. There was concern at attacks worldwide against United Nations, associate and humanitarian personnel, including the bombing outside the headquarters of the United Nations Assistance Mission in Iraq on 19 August 2003.

=== Acts ===
The resolution expressed strong condemnation of all violence to which those in humanitarian operations were exposed, including attacks on convoys and looting of their property. It urged all states to ensure that such crimes did not remain unpunished, reaffirming the obligations of parties involved in armed conflict to comply with international law. The parties were urged to guarantee unimpeded access by humanitarian personnel to people in need of assistance, ensure their safety and freedom of movement, and provide facilitates for their use. The council was determined to ensure such measures were upheld, by:

(a) requesting the Secretary-General to seek the inclusion of and ensure that countries include key provisions of the Convention on the Safety of United Nations and Associated Personnel
(b) encouraging the Secretary-General to bring instances regarding the denial of humanitarian assistance to the Security Council's attention
(c) issuing declarations of exceptional risk under the convention

Finally, the Secretary-General Kofi Annan was instructed to address the issue of the safety and security of humanitarian personnel and United Nations and its associated personnel in his reports to the council, including recommendations on how to prevent future incidents and holding those accountable who perpetrated instances of violence.

== See also ==
- Attacks on humanitarian workers
- Humanitarian principles
- List of United Nations Security Council Resolutions 1501 to 1600 (2003–2005)
