= 2010 Badakhshan massacre =

Killing of aid workers in Afghanistan

2010 Badakhshan killings
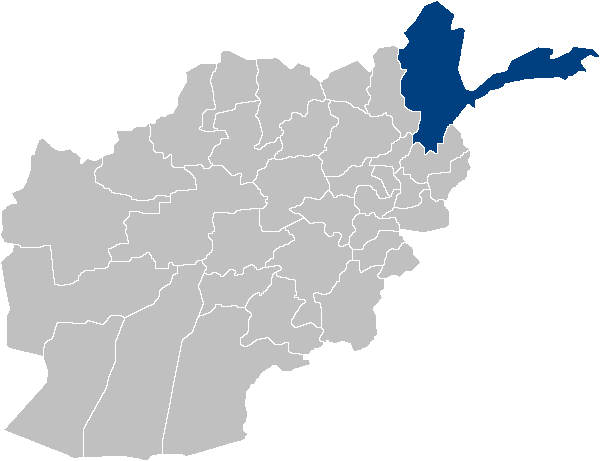
- Badakhshan Province, Afghanistan
- Location: Badakhshan Province, Afghanistan
- Date: 6 August 2010
- Attack type: Shooting
- Deaths: 10

On 5 August 2010, ten members of International Assistance Mission (IAM) Nuristan Eye Camp team were killed in Kuran wa Munjan District of Badakhshan Province in Afghanistan. The team was attacked as it was returning from Nuristan to Kabul. One team member was spared while the rest of the team were killed immediately. Those killed were six Americans, two Afghans, one Briton and one German.

The identity of the attackers is unknown. When news of the killings broke, both Hizb-e Islami and the Taliban initially claimed responsibility for the attack, accusing the doctors of proselytism and spying. These claims were later refuted by Taliban leaders in Nuristan and Badakhshan, who stated that they had confirmed the dead were bona-fide aid workers, condemned the killings as murder, and offered their condolences to the families of those killed.

The attack was the deadliest strike against foreign aid workers in the Afghanistan war. The killings underscored the suspicion Christian-affiliated groups face from some Afghans and government opponents and the wider risks faced by aid workers in the country.

== Background and context ==
Badakhshan province borders Tajikistan and is inhabited by mostly Tajik people. It is one of the few provinces in Afghanistan which was not controlled by the Taliban when it was in power. After coming under increasing pressure by NATO forces in southern Afghanistan the Taliban have become active in areas like Badakhshan Province which were previously calm. In addition they have started using women and children as suicide bombers and targeted tribal elders, things they formerly considered taboo. Foreign aid workers have been attacked in the past but these attacks have been relatively infrequent and Taliban has allowed some aid workers in the areas they controlled. Afghan Independent Human Rights Commission stated that civilian deaths were up five percent in 2010 and Taliban was responsible for 68% of the 1325 deaths till 8 August 2010 and NATO was responsible for 28%. IAM is a Christian organization that has worked in Afghanistan since 1966. They have denied proselytizing, as for non-Muslims it is against the law of the Islamic Republic of Afghanistan. According to critics propagandists of the Taliban insurgency portray their drive for power as a defense of Islam. The victims of the massacre had indeed been sponsored by a Christian charity, but that organization worked in Afghanistan since 1966, under a monarchy, a communist regime, warlords, and under the Taliban; its aid workers were said to understand the Afghan customs and sensibilities and have scrupulously obeyed prohibitions against proselytizing. None of the Christian non-profit's workers had ever been killed while on duty with the organisation.

The publicity on the massacre and its aftermath coincided with the publication of the 2010 Mid-Year Report on Protection of Civilians in Armed Conflict of the United Nations Assistance Mission in Afghanistan (UNAMA), in which worries were expressed about the rising number of civilian casualties in Afghanistan and that was directly followed by an advice of human rights organisation Amnesty International that the Taliban should be prosecuted for war crimes. According to the UNAMA report, the tactics of the Taliban and other Anti-Government Elements (AGEs) were behind a 31 per cent increase in conflict-related civilian casualties in the first six months of 2010 compared with the same period in 2009. Casualties attributed to Pro-Government Forces (PGF) fell 30 per cent during the same period, driven by a 64 per cent decline in deaths and injuries caused by aerial attacks. Many Afghans blame the international forces for the civilian deaths, "stirring up greater violence by fomenting new recruits for the Taliban, for arming militias in the countryside, and for propping up warlords and corrupt Afghan officials".

== Ambush ==
The team, which included a doctor, a dentist and an optometrist, was returning to Kabul after providing eye care to villagers in Parun valley in Nuristan Province, south of Badakhshan Province in Northeast Afghanistan. They had been running an eye camp in Nuristan, for which they had received permission from the Afghan government. They had chosen to travel through a forest in Badakhshan as this was considered a safer route back to Kabul. The team was attacked when they stopped after fording a river. They were killed immediately, without any negotiation. The gunmen took them into the forest, stood them in a line and shot them one by one. One Afghan driver was spared after he started chanting verses from the Qur'an. When the bodies were recovered, the victims appeared to have been robbed. The two Afghans killed worked as a watchman and a cook. The bodies of the victims were flown back to Kabul on 8 August 2010. The foreigners killed were all unpaid volunteers.

== Victims ==
There was a total of 10 victims:

=== Mahram Ali ===
Mahram Ali, aged 51 years, of the Hazara ethnic minority, from Wardak, Afghanistan, was a civilian contractor that had been a worker at the National Organisation for Ophthalmic Rehabilitation's (NOOR's) maintenance workshop since 2007; he served as a driver for the expedition, and as "watcher", to guard team vehicles. In this service to IAM, Ali drove and "stayed behind guarding the vehicles in Nawa when the rest of the team walked over the pass into Nuristan." Ali was described as "the only person to care for his family" by Rahim Majid, the operations manager at IAM. Ali was also survived by a wife and three young children, including one son paralyzed by polio and another son whose arm had been amputated, all supported on his monthly salary of $150.

=== Cheryl Beckett ===
Cheryl Beckett, aged 32 years, was an aid worker and translator, from Knoxville, Tennessee, United States, and an Indiana Wesleyan University graduate. She had lived and worked in Afghanistan since 2005, including with the humanitarian organization Operation Mercy, and specializing in nutritional gardening, kitchen gardening, maternal health and child care. Beckett was proficient in Pashto and joined the Nuristan eye camp team in part to assist as a translator for female patients.

=== Daniela Beyer ===
Daniela Beyer, aged 35 years,was a German linguist and translator from Chemnitz-Wittgensdorf. She specialized in German, English and Russian, whilst also speaking Dari, knowing Wakhi and Munji, as well as learning Pashto. Beyer had previously worked with the International Assistance Mission between 2007 and 2009, conducting linguistic research, and later founded a non-governmental organization dedicated to documenting and preserving minority languages in Afghanistan. She joined the eye camp team to provide translation support, particularly for female patients.

=== Brian Carderelli ===
Brian Carderelli, aged 25 years and from Harrisonburg, Virginia, United States, was a civilian contractor, and a professional freelance videographer who had worked with various Afghan development and humanitarian organizations in Afghanistan. Carderelli had been working for the International School of Kabul, and documenting aid work done by the IAM and other groups. A statement released by his family said that Carderelli "loved people and was particularly concerned for the poor". He was a lifelong member of Covenant Presbyterian Church in Harrisonburg, and a 2009 graduate of James Madison University and was approaching the one year anniversary of his service in Afghanistan. According to his family, "Brian quickly fell in love with the Afghan people and culture and hoped to stay within the country for another year", and was compiling a photographic and video album entitled "The Beautiful – It's Not All War."

=== Thomas Grams ===
Thomas Grams, aged 51 years, of Durango, Colorado, United States, friend of team leader Tom Little, began to work in dentistry for impoverished children about 10 years before his death, via Denver-based agency Global Dental Relief (GDR). One of native twin brothers and dentists from Park Rapids, Minnesota, Grams left their "thriving" private general dentistry practice in Durango in 2007 to join GDR full-time, going first to Nepal ("trekk[ing]... halfway up... Everest, carrying dental equipment by yak"), and then several times to Afghanistan, initially as a volunteer, and later as team leader. Significant Afghanistan efforts included providing free dental care in the village Wardak, "negotiat[ing] the etiquette of the burka" to found a Kabul dental clinic (employing a local female dentist), and participating in English teaching at a local school. "[U]nassuming and modest," Grams was described by the IAM as "one of our favorit[e]" aid workers.

=== Jawed ===
Jawed, known by this single name, aged 24 years, from Panjshir, Afghanistan, was a civilian contractor that had been at the Eye Hospital of the Afghan Ministry of Public Health in Kabul, and was given leave to serve as the team cook at its Eye Camp. This was not his first service with IAM, where he cooked and helped with dispensing eyeglasses; per the IAM, "Jawed had been on several eye camps into Nuristan in the past, and was well loved for his sense of humor", and was known for providing his collection of music tapes for weddings and parties. The principal breadwinner for his wife, three young children, and extended family, Jawed had been excited about the $20 per day in overtime that he was earning on the medical outreach trip. Jawed's brother Abdul Bagin described his killers as "infidels; not human, not Muslims... [killing] without any judgment, without any trial".

=== Glen D. Lapp ===
Glen D. Lapp, aged 40 years, was a nurse and executive assistant from Lancaster, Pennsylvania, United States, and a part of Community Mennonite Church of Lancaster. Lapp was a medical volunteer with the IAM and its partner, the Mennonite Central Committee (MCC). He was serving as manager of IAM's provincial Ophthalmology program, and as an executive assistant for IAM in Afghanistan, and had been in Afghanistan for two years. Lapp was an alumnus of Eastern Mennonite and Johns Hopkins Universities, and had assisted the MCC in the weeks following Hurricanes Katrina and Rita, with regular prior nursing work Lancaster, Supai, Arizona, and New York City.

=== Tom Little ===
Tom Little, aged 61 years, was an optometrist from Delmar, New York, United States, and leader of the IAM team. Little had worked in Afghanistan for more than three decades, having arrived in the late 1970s; he had raised three daughters there, and spoke Dari fluently. Little was posthumously recognized as International Optometrist of the Year by the World Council of Optometry, and the 2010 Presidential Medal of Freedom.

=== Dan Terry ===
Dan Terry, aged 64 years, was from Wisconsin, United States, who served as liaison with local communities, aid organizations, and the government; he had performed relief work in Afghanistan since 1971, following in his father's footsteps who had worked for IAM as the executive director. He is survived by his wife, three daughters, their spouses and seven grandchildren.

=== Karen Woo ===
Karen Woo, aged 36 years, daughter of a Chinese father and English mother, was a general surgeon from Stevenage, Hertfordshire, UK, trained at St Mary's Hospital, London and formerly with the English healthcare organisation Bupa. Woo's work involved helping pregnant women, in an area with a high global infant mortality rate. After her death, Woo's family stated that "although very spiritual, she did not really believe in organised religion" and that her motivations were purely humanitarian. Woo was engaged to be married at the time of her death.

=== Survivors ===
The only two survivors of the eye camp team were Said Yasin and Safiullah, both Afghan. Said Yasin had left the team several days earlier and returned to Kabul by another route, whereas Safiullah was spared after reciting verses from the Koran.

== Responsibility ==
The local officials initially stated that the motive was robbery, but after interviewing witnesses they changed their view and said that Taliban was responsible. Taliban spokesman Zabiullah Mujahid claimed responsibility for the attacks and accused the victims of being "American spies" and "proselytizing Christianity". He also claimed that the victims had Bibles in their possession which had been translated into Dari, the local language. However, another group also was mentioned, the Hizb-i-Islami (HIA) of warlord Gulbuddin Hekmatyar. Earlier claims of the Taliban were refuted by Qari Malang, the representative of the Western Nuristan Taliban. He said that commanders from Nuristan had not carried out the killings and they had launched an investigation to find out who had. "We shall inform you of the results when it is concluded. We regret these killings and strongly assert that this is not the work of the Taliban who will never do harm to genuine aid workers... as soon as we manage to apprehend those responsible for this act, we shall subject them to whatever punishment our laws prescribe." Dirk Frans, executive director of the IAM in Kabul, doubted whether the local Taliban were behind the attack, in contrast to a statement by U.S. Secretary of State Hillary Clinton which directly blamed the Taliban for what she described as a "despicable act of wanton violence".. In her reaction on 8 August 2010, she stated: "We condemn in the strongest possible terms this senseless act. We also condemn the Taliban’s transparent attempt to justify the unjustifiable by making false accusations about their activities in Afghanistan. Terror has no religion (...), they have shown us yet another example of the lengths to which they will go to advance their twisted ideology."

== Reactions ==
In the weeks following the attack a senior Taliban leader, Qari Malang (the representative of the Western Nuristan Taliban) stated "We have checked the facts regarding these foreigners, and our people in the area have confirmed that they were bona fide aid workers and had been providing assistance to the population. Furthermore, we have learnt that among the killed foreigners, was Dan Terry, who had a long history of helping our people, including in Kunar and Laghman provinces and that he had previously provided welfare assistance to the families of those civilians martyred in bombardments... We pass on our condolences to the families of those killed."

After the massacre, the IAM stated that they had no plans to leave Afghanistan. US Federal Bureau of Investigation has opened an investigation into the attacks according to a spokesman from US embassy.

Former Afghan presidential candidate Abdullah Abdullah who is a physician himself and trained with Tom Little deplored the killings and called the attackers "enemies of the Afghan people."

United Nations Secretary-General Ban Ki-moon, who emphasized that "health workers must have access to treat those in need and must be able to do so without fear". His Special Representative Staffan de Mistura said "The United Nations condemns this serious crime and apparent cold-blooded execution."

Australian foreign minister Stephen Smith issued a statement condemning the attack and offered condolences to the victims' families. British foreign secretary William Hague condemned the attack and stated "This is a deplorable and cowardly act which is against the interests of the people of Afghanistan who depended on the services she [Karen Woo] was bravely helping to provide." United States Secretary of State Hillary Clinton condemned the killings, calling them "despicable acts of wanton violence". (see above) Karl Eikenberry, the current United States Ambassador to Afghanistan, speaking to Afghan people said, "Their murder demonstrates the absolute disregard that terrorist-inspired Taliban and other insurgents have for your health, have for your security and have for your opportunity, They don't care about your future. They only care about themselves and their own ideology." US special envoy Richard Holbrooke stated the killers do not represent average Afghans, most of whom were shocked by these killings.

== See also ==
- For photographs of individual victims, and human interest details, see Shaila Dewan & Rod Nordland, 2010, "Slain Aid Workers Were Bound by Their Sacrifice," The New York Times (online), August 9, 2010, accessed 4 January 2014.
- 2007 South Korean hostage crisis in Afghanistan
- February 2010 Kabul attack
- Death of Linda Norgrove
