= SERVE Afghanistan =

UK charity working in Afghanistan

Serve Afghanistan is a charity registered in the UK which works in Afghanistan carrying out community development, education and training projects, particularly for Afghans with disabilities.

It was founded in 1972 to help victims of a famine in Ghor in Afghanistan and it was formally registered in 1980 as SERVE. In 2005 the charity transferred all assets to the newly formed charity Serve Afghanistan.

Serve Afghanistan is primarily funded by grants from other international charities.
