= International Assistance Mission =

Christian development non-governmental organization operating in Afghanistan

The International Assistance Mission (IAM) is the longest continually serving non-profit organisation in Afghanistan. They are a well-respected NGO working to improve lives and build local capacity in health, development and education. They are a partnership between the people of Afghanistan and international Christian volunteers, who have been working together since 1966. IAM is registered in Geneva, Switzerland, and is the longest continuously serving NGO in Afghanistan, and only works in Afghanistan.

History

The International Afghan Mission (IAM) was established in Kabul on February 2, 1966. IAM's first projects include founding the National Organisation for Ophthalmic Rehabilitation (NOOR), the Medical Assistance Program (MAP), a school for the visually impaired (BINA), and a literacy programme. In 1978, the International Afghan Mission changed its name to the International Assistance Mission.

Since 1966, IAM has helped an estimated five million Afghans, particularly through its NOOR eye care work.

Several members of an IAM Eye Camp team were murdered in August 2010 in the Afghan province of Badakhshan.

Current projects

An eye operation at one of the NOOR teaching hospitals.

National Organisation for Ophthalmic Rehabilitation (NOOR)

The NOOR programme provides the vast majority of all ophthalmic care in Afghanistan. NOOR takes its name from a Persian word meaning “light”, and is the longest running IAM programme. It has referral eye hospitals in the main cities of Kabul, Mazar-i-Sharif, and Kandahar. NOOR also provides logistical support to the government eye hospitals in Kabul and Herat (which were originally founded by IAM). NOOR is also providing eye care in more remotes parts of the country through Vision Centers.

In 2020, NOOR treated 144,976 patients and performed 10,153 surgeries. NOOR dispensed 22,225 pairs of glasses, and 268,994 bottles of eyedrops. NOOR has a particular emphasis on training and it runs a three-year ophthalmology residency programme. Almost all ophthalmologists and all ophthalmic technicians in Afghanistan have been trained by NOOR.

Development

IAM are passionate about using best practices for tackling the poverty and injustice that prevents communities and individuals from thriving. They work in partnership with communities to help some of the poorest people in Afghanistan transform their lives.

Their philosophy is that development needs to be holistic – looking at the whole needs of a person and their community. They aim to facilitate that through four key objectives: Transformation of society: increased quality of life at an emotional, academic, physical, and social level; Replication of skills: increasing capacity to continue using and developing tools and skills; Innovation and integration: continuous learning, both focusing on research, and trialling creative solutions to root issues; Implementation: continuing to build their internal capacity to implement and grow our development programmes.

Mental Health Programme

IAM has been working to improve services for and awareness of mental health issues since 1996. The Mental Health Training Centre (MHTC) was established in 1996 in response to the high suicide rate among women. It provides a unique role in the country, treating patients and training nurses and doctors who specialise in mental health provision for people who live in Western Afghanistan. The aim of that project has been to build Afghan capacity to manage and provide quality mental health services by providing: mental health training for doctors, nurses, and midwives working in community health facilities; training psychiatry residents in partnership with the Ministry of Health; and training psychosocial counselors to work in government clinics in remote communities across the West and South of Afghanistan. In 2017, 3,598 new patients were registered at MHTC, 64 psychosocial counselors graduated from a one-year training course and started to work in community health facilities, and 131 doctors and nurses received mental health training to better equip them to recognise and appropriately advise or refer on patients with mental health problems. In 2018, IAM was able to handover MHTC to the Government of Afghanistan, which was a key step towards the long-term sustainability of the project. IAM continues to provide technical support for that project.

In 2020, IAM's Mental Health Programme had five key strands: the Positive Parenting Project, aiming to reduce levels of violence against children; the Community-Based Mental Health Project, aiming to achieve sustainable improvement in the lives of people with psychosocial disabilities and their families; the Child and Adolescent Psychiatry Project, working to improve the mental health and full inclusion into community life for children with psychosocial disabilities; the Youth Emotional Resiliency Project, which aims for sustainable improvement in the emotional resilience of young people in Herat Province; and the Health Social Counsellors Project, Filling the gap with accessibility and development of specific professional mental health cadre (health social counselor) in public health facilities.

English as a Foreign Language (EFL)

The IAM EFL programme teaches intermediate and advanced levels of English to assist Afghans in their professional and academic careers.

In 2020, 178 students attended their English classes, 51% of the students were women, 21 students participated in IAM's 6-month pre-intermediate level course, 40 students graduated from their 6-month upper-intermediate level course.

Language and Orientation Programme (LOP)

IAM provides an orientation programme and language courses in Dari and Pashto for expatriate workers and diplomats in Afghanistan.

Professional training

In addition to the above, IAM continues to second professionals to train Afghans through Individual Service Assignments (ISA). In the past, this has included training Afghans in the government, hospitals, other NGOs, and private businesses. Most of these individuals have years of experience in Afghanistan and speak the local language.

Former projects

An Afghan IAM RESAP engineer working on a micro-hydro turbine.

Wakhi Language Development (WLD)

Wakhi is a minority language with no written form, and is spoken only in Wakhan, in north-eastern Afghanistan. WLD was launched in April 2009 to research, analyse and document Wakhi and develop easy reading materials, so that Wakhi speakers are able to receive education in their mother tongue. In 2010 this project was handed over to another NGO.

Hazarajat Community Health Project (HCHP)

Initially begun by IAM as a Mother and Child Health Clinic in 1999, this project expanded to include 157 Health Posts, 5 Basic Health Centers (BHC), and a Comprehensive Health Center (CHC). HCHP became responsible to provide the primary health service for the district in Lal-wa-Sarjangal. HCHP trained nurses, vaccinators, and community health supervisors. In 2008, it treated almost 30,000 patients. In May 2009, the responsibility of HCHP was handed over to an Afghan NGO.

Orthopedic Workshop and Physiotherapy Center (OWPC)

OWPC aims to reduce the impact of disability in Faryab province. It trains Afghan staff to provide services to people with disabilities. In 2010, it provided over 1900 orthopaedic appliances and assistive devices, and provided physiotherapy to over 1000 people. OWPC also used Community-Based Rehabilitation (CBR) to increase community awareness of disability issues, and to help disabled people with education, healthcare and livelihood development.

Physical Therapy Institute (PTI)

PTI trained physical therapists with a three-year Diploma course, and trained physical therapy teachers. It also developed physical therapy materials and had an outpatient clinic.

Renewable Energy Sources in Afghanistan Project (RESAP)

RESAP worked to build up the local renewable energy industry throughout the country. It used Afghan-made micro-hydro plants and wind turbines to provide electricity for rural regions. RESAP also trained Afghan engineers and technicians to build and install these units.

Adult Learning and Education Facilitation (ALEF)

The ALEF project worked in three provinces to provide non-formal adult education and vocational training. Using folkbildning methods, ALEF offered learning circles in tailoring, mobile phone repair, computer skills, literacy, English language, maternal and infant health, and vocational counseling. It also provided training for trainers of adult learners.

Business Development Services (BDS)

BDS taught very basic business skills and literacy to low-income Afghan women. Its aim is to contribute to the socio-economic development of families and communities by enabling them to run simple home-based businesses. In 2010, BDS taught 145 women, and 35 workers from other NGOs were trained as trainers.

Structure

The International Assistance Mission only works in Afghanistan, and its headquarters are in Kabul. IAM is directed by a board of eight members who meet bi-annually, and a general assembly that meets every two years. The general assembly elects the board, and the board appoints the executive director.

IAM is registered as a non-profit association in Geneva, Switzerland. IAM is also registered in the Islamic Republic of Afghanistan under the Ministry of Economy. It was the first NGO to be re-registered under the new Afghan government in 2005.

IAM is a signatory to the Principles of Conduct for The International Red Cross and Red Crescent and NGOs in Disaster Response Programmes, and ascribes to the code that aid will not be used to further a particular political or religious standpoint. IAM fully commits to the standard that aid is given regardless of the race, creed or nationality of the recipients and without adverse distinction of any kind.

Staff

All IAM expatriate staff come as volunteers and are responsible for their own financial support. In 2019, IAM employed around 350 paid Afghan staff, and 20+ professional volunteers from Europe, North America, Asia and Oceania. Foreign staff members are required to learn a local language and the average length of assignment is 3 years. Some IAM expatriate staff have stayed over 20 years in Afghanistan. In 2009, a German nurse retired after 37 years of working with IAM in a remote rural area.

Attacks and casualties

Main article: 2010 Badakhshan massacre

Twelve expat volunteers and two Afghan staff have been killed while working with IAM in Afghanistan. The second-most recent incident occurred in August 2010, when suspected Taliban militants ambushed and killed a team of 10 doctors and optometrists who were returning from a medical care trip to remote mountain villages in northeastern Afghanistan. Those killed were six Americans, two Afghans, one Briton, and one German.

2014 Herat shooting

On 24 July 2014 two Finnish IAM female aid workers were shot dead by two gunmen on motorbikes while riding in a taxi in Herat.

Funding

Projects are funded by foreign donor organisations, governments, the United Nations, private donations, and locally generated income. No project funds are used for expatriate salaries, allowances, home rents, or daily expenses.

== Publications ==
Publications in English

- Enjoy Afghanistan is an orientation manual for expatriate workers and their families in Afghanistan. It includes information about everyday life, history, culture, security, cooking, health and wellbeing, and more.

A collection of language books have been written to assist foreigners in learning the local languages.

- Conversational Dari
- Speaking Afghan Pashto
- Progressing in Pashtu
- Picture it in Dari and Pashto
- Dari Verb Notebook
- 100 Afghan Persian Proverbs
- Sound the bells, O moon, arise and shine! a collection of Pashto proverbs and tappas.
- Eat Your Way to Good Health a bilingual cookbook.
- nosh-e jAn kunEn an IAM cookbook.

The following medical textbooks were written by IAM doctors and personnel in Afghanistan to provide practical, relevant and affordable medical information.

- Practical Drug Guide a handbook for the correct prescribing of essential drugs.
- Practical Paediatric Guide information for doctors to reduce infant mortality.
- Practical Guide to Mental Health Problems
- Practical Guide to Common Medical Problems
- Medical Dari a language resource in Dari and Hazaragi for medical professionals.
- Pocket Medical Pashto

Publications in Dari

- Eat Your Way to Good Health a bilingual cookbook.
- Practical Drug Guide is a handbook for the correct prescribing of essential drugs.
- Practical Paediatric Guide
- Practical Guide to Mental Health Problems
- Practical Guide to Common Medical Problems

The following simple business skills books were written by IAM's BDS project to help low-income uneducated Afghan women into self-employment.

- Step by Step
- First Steps
- Teacher's Guide to First Steps
- Picture Books a set of 24 illustrated story books, each explaining a different business principle.

Publications in Pashto

- Practical Drug Guide is a handbook for the correct prescribing of essential drugs.
