= Steve Dennis =

Steve Dennis may refer to:

- Steve Dennis (Canadian football) (1951–2026), Canadian gridiron football player
- Steve Dennis (humanitarian), Canadian humanitarian

== See also ==
- Stephen Dennis (born 1987), American basketball player
