= Norwegian Refugee Council =

Norwegian humanitarian organization

- Founded: 1946
- Type: Humanitarian NGO
- Location: Oslo, Norway
- Fields: Humanitarian Aid, Activism
- Secretary General: Jan Egeland
- Staff: 15,000
- Website: www.nrc.no

The Norwegian Refugee Council (NRC; Norwegian: Flyktninghjelpen) is a humanitarian, non-governmental organisation that protects the rights of people affected by displacement. This includes refugees and internally displaced persons who are forced to flee their homes as a result of conflict, human rights violations and acute violence, as well as climate change and natural disasters.

== History ==
NRC is politically independent and has no religious affiliation. It is the only Norwegian organisation that specialises in international efforts to provide assistance, protection and durable solutions for people affected by displacement. NRC employs approximately 16,500 staff members and incentive workers in 40 countries throughout Africa, Asia, South America, Europe and the Middle East. The NRC headquarters is located in Oslo and has about 280 employees. Additionally the organisation has a presence in Brussels, Geneva, Washington, D.C., Berlin, London and Addis Ababa.

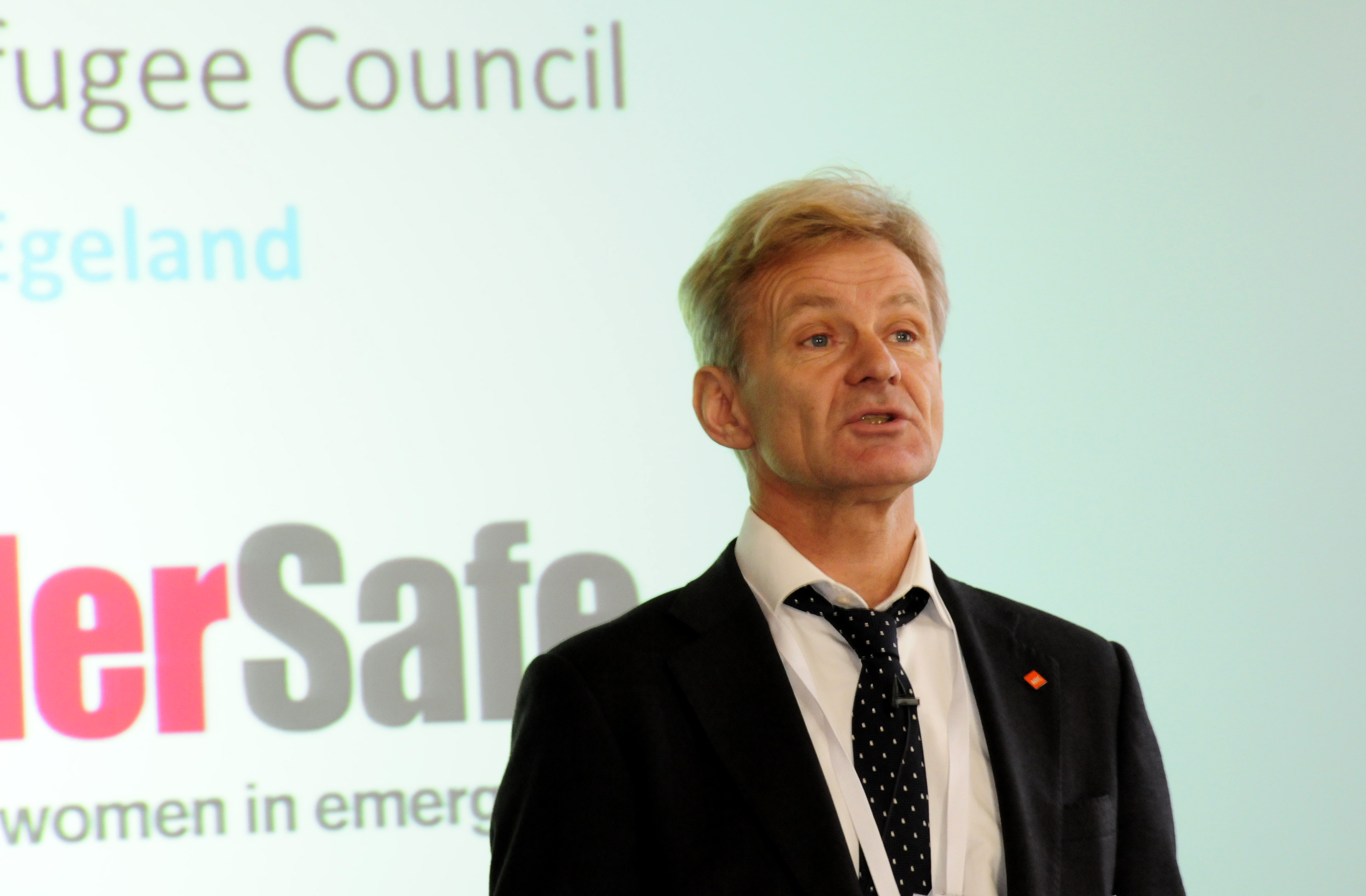
Jan Egeland, Secretary General of the Norwegian Refugee Council

NRC was established in 1946 under the name "Europahjelpen" ("Aid to Europe"), to assist refugees in Europe after World War II. In 1953, the organisation changed to its current name, Norwegian Refugee Council (NRC). Today NRC is organised as an independent, private foundation.

NRC's primary focus is the provision of humanitarian aid during the emergency stage of a conflict or natural disaster. It pursues a holistic, rights-based approach that includes emergency relief and early recovery while promoting resilience and sustainable solutions for displacement.

Jan Egeland took up the position as Secretary General in August 2013, replacing Elisabeth Rasmusson who was appointed to the position of Assistant Executive Director of the World Food Programme (WFP).

== Core activities ==
The core activities of the NRC are the following:

- Shelter and settlements: Emergency shelter, housing, schools and establishment of other forms of public infrastructure.
- Livelihoods and food Security: Providing food assistance to prevent loss of life and to contribute to the rehabilitation of local food and market systems. Promoting livelihood strategies that protect, recover and strengthen individuals' and households' abilities to earn a living.
- Information, counselling and legal assistance (ICLA): Enabling people affected by displacement to claim and exercise their rights and to find lasting solutions. Focus areas include housing, land and property rights, legal documentation, statelessness and refugee status procedures.
- Water, sanitation and hygiene (WASH): Providing access to, and promotion of, clean water and appropriate sanitation facilities.
- Education: Education programmes targeted towards children and youth.
- Protection from violence: Help to ensure displaced people and communities are protected, by preventing and responding to violence, coercion, and actions taken by others to deny them their rights.

== Agencies ==
In 1998, NRC established the Internal Displacement Monitoring Centre in Geneva. The IDMC contributes to improving national and international capacities to assist people around the globe who have been displaced. IDMC also develops statistics and analysis on internal displacement, including analysis commissioned for use by the United Nations.

NORCAP is a standby roster operated by NRC and funded by the Norwegian Ministry of Foreign Affairs which consists of 650 men and women from Norway, Africa, Asia, Middle East and Latin America. Since its establishment in 1991, NORCAP's experts have been sent on more than 7,000 missions worldwide.

== Publications ==
NRC previously published the magazine "Perspective" four times a year. The magazine focused on the humanitarian dimensions of international politics. The magazine was on sale in more than 15 countries.

In 2001, the NRC published in collaboration with Pluto Press the book Caught Between Borders: Response Strategies of the Internally Displaced, which was edited by Marc Vincent and Birgitte Refslund Sorensen.

== Awards and recognition ==
The Nansen Refugee Award is an international award that is yearly given by the UN High Commissioner for Refugees (UNHCR) to a person or group for outstanding work on behalf of the forcibly displaced. Since 2009 NRC has been working with the UNCHR for organising and carrying out the ceremony. The award consists of a commemorative medal and a US$100,000 monetary prize donated by the governments of Norway and Switzerland.

In 2022, the Norwegian Refugee Council received the Hilton Humanitarian Prize from the Conrad N. Hilton Foundation, the world's largest annual humanitarian award, with a value of US$2.5 million.

== 2012 kidnapping incident ==
In July 2012, two vehicles carrying a high-level Norwegian Refugee Council delegation were ambushed outside of a Dadaab camp. A driver was killed and four international staff were abducted, including Steve Dennis. According to the Norwegian Refugee Council spokesman, a risk analysis had been carried out before movements through Dadaab and it was declared safe for travel. A Kenyan police commander said that a security escort had been arranged to accompany the delegation but the group declined. In the aftermath of the kidnapping incident, Steve Dennis filed a lawsuit against the Norwegian Refugee Council, accusing it of gross negligence and failing to provide adequate support for the post-traumatic stress disorder (PTSD) and gunshot wounds he suffered during the ordeal. In 2015, the Oslo District Court ruled in favour of Dennis, finding the Norwegian Refugee Council guilty of gross negligence and breach of duty of care. The court recognised the physical and psychological injuries sustained by Dennis and awarded compensation for gross negligence, amounting to 4.4 million Norwegian kroner (approximately £350,000).
