= NORCAP =

Norwegian humanitarian organization

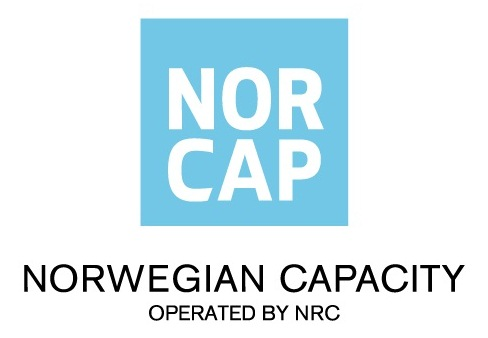
- Founded: 1991
- Location: Oslo, Norway
- Key people: Benedicte Giæver, Director Emergency Response Department
- Website: www.nrc.no/norcap

NORCAP is a global provider of expertise to the humanitarian, development and peace-building sectors. It is operated by the Norwegian Refugee Council and funded by the Norwegian government. NORCAP works to strengthen the resilience and protect the lives, livelihoods and rights of vulnerable people and communities.

== Activities ==
NORCAP has a pool of more than 1,000 professionals, recruited to meet the changing demands of a wide range of partners, situations and crises. They cover the following thematic areas: crisis response, resilience and clean energy, cash programming, gender, needs analysis, protection, human rights and democratisation. Some of NORCAP's specialised projects are run in cooperation with UN partner organisations.

In 2018, NORCAP supported 48 partners in 83 countries with 646 experienced humanitarian specialists.

== History ==
NORCAP's precursor, NORSTAFF, was established in response to the Kurdish refugee crisis following the Gulf War in 1991. The United Nations High Commissioner for Refugees requested Norwegian authorities to provide personnel with experience from working in emergency situations. The Norwegian Foreign Ministry agreed to establish and fund a standby roster, while the Norwegian Refugee Council was given the task of building, managing and developing the roster further.

The Norwegian Refugee Council also established a set of regional standby forces – NORAFRIC, NORMIDEAST and NORASIA – with personnel from Africa, the Middle East and Asia.

In 2009, the various standby rosters, NORSTAFF, NORAFRIC, NORMIDEAST, NORASIA and the observer roster NOROBS, merged under the name NORCAP (Norwegian capacity to international operations).

In 2017, NORDEM, the Norwegian resource bank for democracy and human rights was transferred from the University of Oslo to NORCAP.

NORCAP has developed from a standby roster to a strategic partner, not only providing additional staff in emergencies, but also developing projects with partners at national, regional and global levels, to strengthen their capacity to build communities and ensure transitions from conflict to democratic societies.

== UN partners ==
- UNICEF
- UNHCR
- UNDP
- FAO
- WFP
- OCHA
- IOM
- UNRWA
- UNESCO
- UN-HABITAT
- UNFPA
- UN Women
- UNEP
- OHCHR
