= Kampala Convention =

International agreement of the African Union adopted in 2009

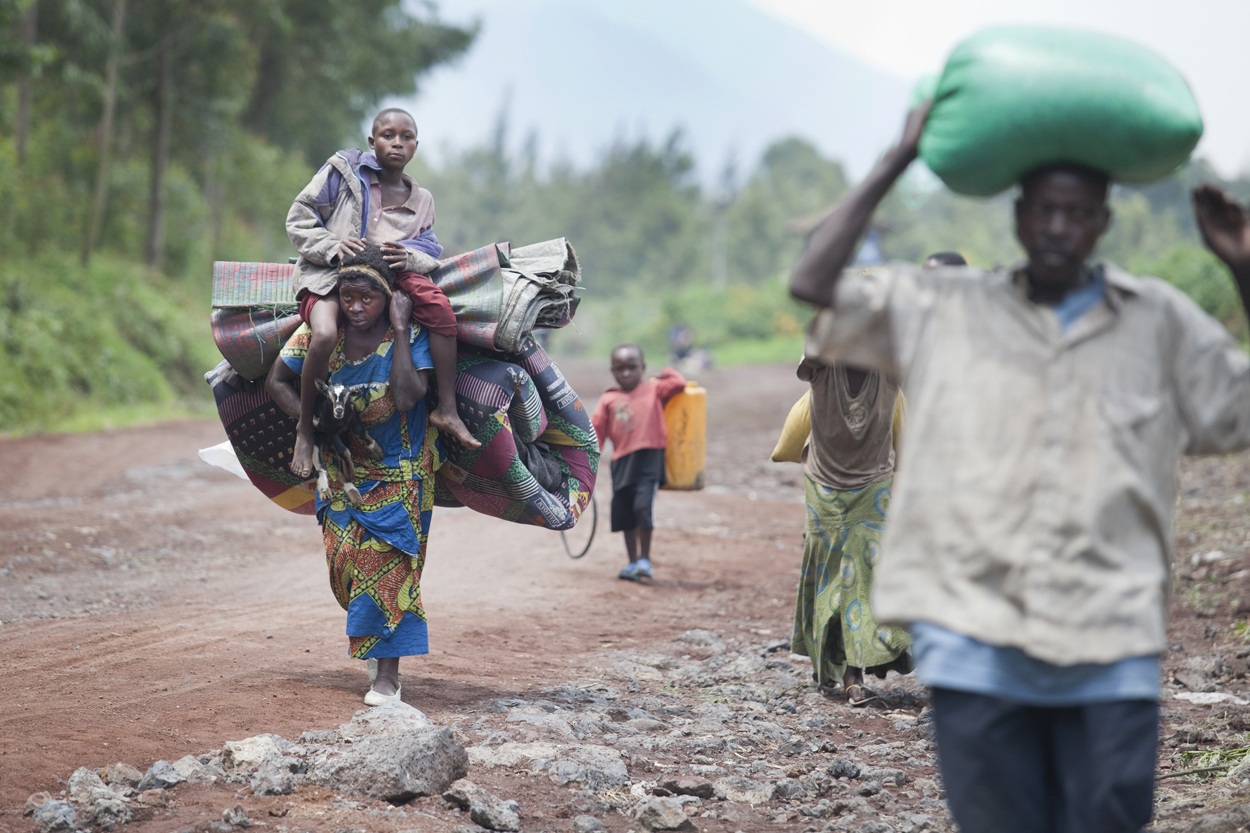
Group of internally displaced persons arrives in Munigi, Democratic Republic of the Congo in 2013

The Kampala Convention (formally, the African Union Convention for the Protection and Assistance of Internally Displaced Persons in Africa) is a treaty of the African Union (AU) that addresses internal displacement caused by armed conflict, natural disasters and large-scale development projects in Africa.

Large populations of internally displaced persons have existed and continue to exist in Africa, and these are due to many causes, the most prominent being violence, environmental factors, development and social conflict.

Adoption of the official text and content approbation and adoption by the AU was performed in 2009. In 2012, 15 member states ratified the Convention— marking formal adoption by the AU. Since that time 30 of now-55 member states have ratified the Convention, with many others on having ratified, being on track to do so, or expressing interest in doing so.

Despite its progress, the African continent's IDP populations continue to be high— accounting for a third of the global IDP population. Critics, scholars, and international organizations point to less-than-substantial emphasis of effective implementation by ratifying states. Consideration of special populations and women has also been called for by these groups.

== History ==
The situation and presence of internally displaced persons (IDPs) is not a recent occurrence in human history, but rather due to societal factors gained a larger audience after the Cold War. The experience and protection of internally displaced persons varies widely from those groups and individuals deemed refugees. In contrast to refugees, IDPs do not receive support from the United Nations High Commissioner of Refugees (UNHCR), and there is no comparable agency that accommodates the needs of these individuals.

Many past forced migration organization efforts in Africa and internationally substantially influenced the Kampala Convention— including the 1969 Organization of African Unity Convention Governing the Specific Aspects of Refugee Problems in Africa and the 1998 Guiding Principles on Internal Displacement developed by the United Nations. The Guiding Principles have inspired and guided similarly focused regulations crafted by entities at the regional and national levels worldwide. These remain the major framework for protection of internally displaced persons globally.

In 2011, prior to the signing of this treaty, close to 10 million people were estimated to be internally displaced persons across sub-Saharan Africa. This number represented over half of the population of internally displaced persons in the World with the largest number in 2011 residing in the Democratic Republic of the Congo. Several states within the African continent, including Democratic Republic of the Congo, Sudan, and Somalia, are among the five nations with the largest displacement situations globally. Specifically, the Darfur region of Sudan was of special interest in the consideration of the situation of internally displaced persons in that region of Africa.

The primary factor that most of these displacement situations can be attributed to is violence, which can further be related to histories of colonialism, external intervention, and social and physical conflicts within states.

Development is one of the rising factors contributing to internal displacement within the African region— being attributable to more of the situations of internal displacement than war. In 2012, the number of displaced individuals was greater than the refugee global total. Additionally, internally displaced persons are very often subject to increased influence by militia or armed forces groups.

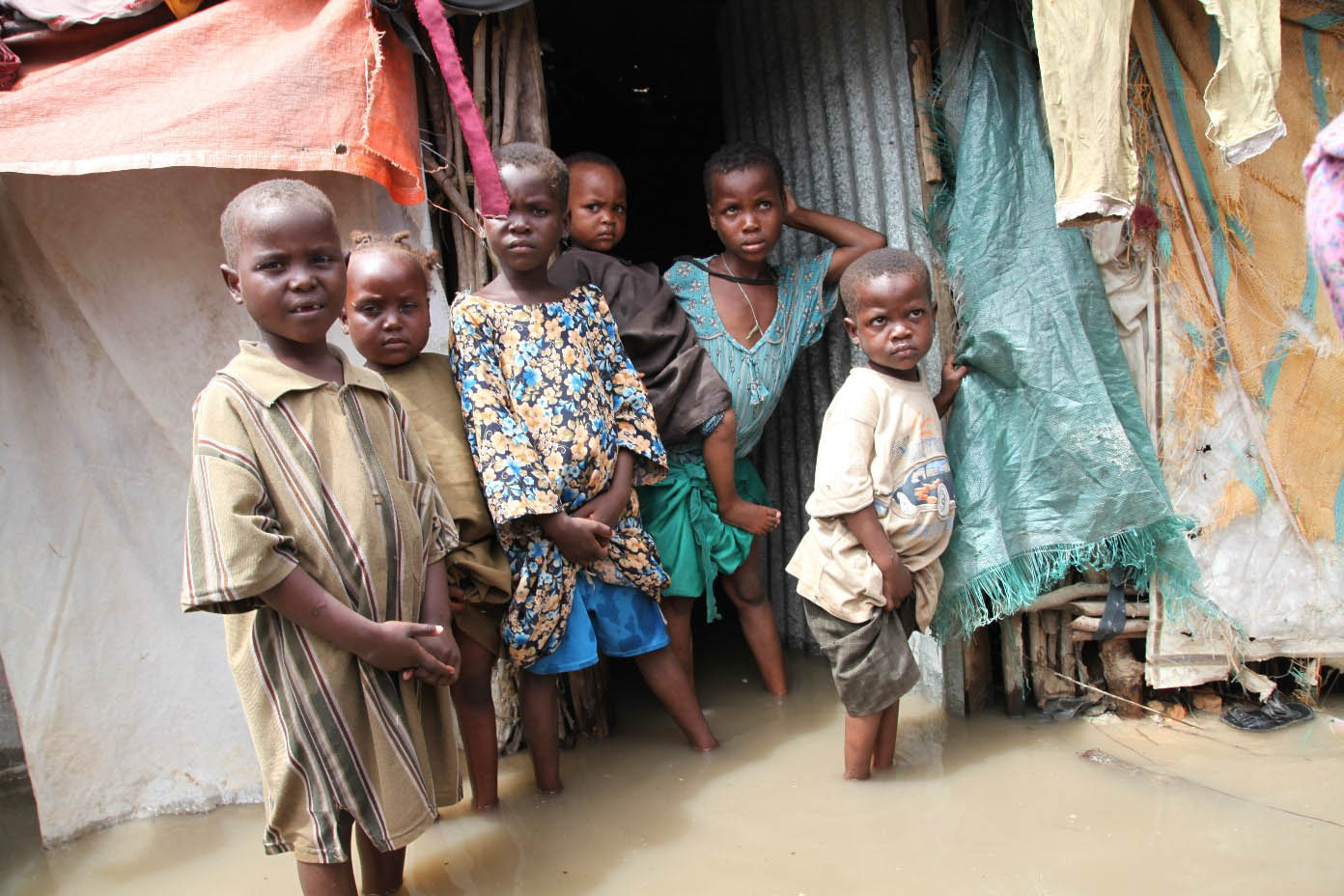
Children are photographed outside their flooded makeshift home in Kismayo, Somalia, in 2014. Environmental factors and anthropogenic climate change have significantly altered the lives of IDPs in Africa.

Environmental factors, and their impact on human populations, are particularly pronounced in Africa, although it is the area of the World with the least contribution to anthropogenic climate change. Natural disasters have displaced more and more numbers of individuals every year. It was estimated that approximately 1 million individuals were displaced by natural disasters and occurrences in 2009— and close to 2 million were displaced the following year. The plight of individuals displaced by natural disaster is most greatly emphasized in the Horn of Africa. Drought is of particular concern. In Somalia alone, an estimated one and a half million individuals were displaced from their homes in 2011 due to drought. In 2012, it was estimated that over eight million people were newly displaced in Africa due to natural disasters.

Close to six after the adoption of the Kampala Convention, in 2018, it was estimated that 16.7 million IDPs still existed in Africa— accounting for close to one-third of IDPs globally, a number estimated at that time to be approximately 40 million. Globally, the number of IDPs has been on the rise in recent years— doubling in the period from 2009–2018.

== Organization ==
Organizations such as the UNHCR, the IOM, the ICRC, and others aided the African Union in formulating the early text which constituted the Convention. Further meetings in 2007 and 2008 finalized the official text, and in October 2009, the contents of the treaty were considered and adopted. Since then, a number of countries have ratified the Convention.

=== List of African Union nations that have ratified the Kampala Convention ===
(as of 29 October 2019):

- Angola
- Benin
- Burkina Faso
- Cameroon
- Central African Republic
- Chad
- Democratic Republic of the Congo
- Djibouti
- Equatorial Guinea
- Eswatini
- Gabon
- Gambia
- Guinea
- Guinea-Bissau
- Ivory Coast
- Lesotho
- Liberia
- Malawi
- Mali
- Mauritania
- Niger
- Nigeria
- Republic of the Congo
- Rwanda
- Sahrawi Arab Democratic Republic
- Sierra Leone
- South Sudan
- Togo
- Uganda
- Zambia
- Zimbabwe

The list includes 30 of the 55 current members of the African Union.

Additionally, it should also be noted that since 29 October 2019, many countries— including Mozambique, Cape Verde, Ethiopia, Senegal, Sudan, and Somalia— have either ratified the Convention recently, are close to ratification, or have expressed a strong interest in doing so recently.

== Treaty contents ==
The Convention defines displaced persons as “persons or groups of persons who have been forced or obliged to flee or to leave their homes or places of habitual residence, in particular as a result of or in order to avoid the effects of armed conflict, situations of generalized violence, violations of human rights or natural or human-made disasters, and who have not crossed an internationally recognized State border.

The Convention reinforces in legal sense that the primary duty of lending support and ensuring and providing protection to internally displaced persons is that of the State's. The Convention explicitly links internal displacement specially in the fields of violence, war, human rights violations, and environmental depreciation. It heavily emphasizes the right of individuals to not be what the stakeholding parties deemed arbitrarily displaced individuals and groups— following the regular pattern of international law conformation in regards to justification of displacement, but also expanding upon regular rule here to include specific barring of the use of harmful practices and development projects as an explicit cause or justification of displacement.

The document proceeds in the following sequential order— an overview of regulations and protections related to arbitrary displacement, protections given to IDPs throughout the process of displacement, and concludes with a delineation of solutions for the greater situation as a whole.

=== Key articles ===
The treaty includes provisions, specifically Article 3, detailing and expanding the rights of internally displaced persons mainly associated with climate change and factors relating to the environment.
Through documents like the Convention, states hope to be able to reduce this by supporting systems, groups, and individuals aimed at advocating and serving the interests of IDPs. Article 7 provides an overview of the non-state actors and their roles in this situation.

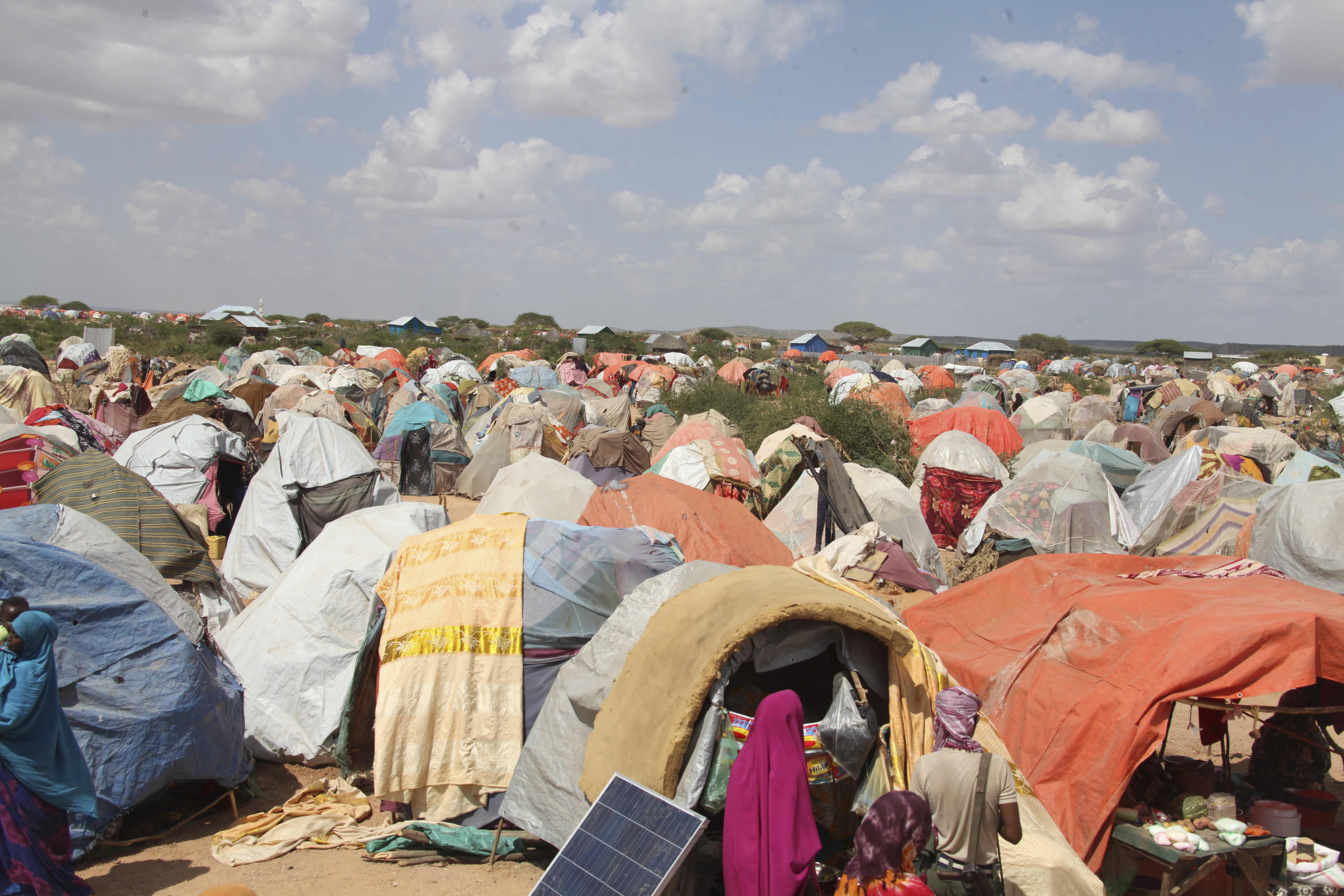
Large array of makeshift homes in an IDP camp in Hiran, Somalia (2014)

=== Article summaries ===
Article 1: guiding definition of internally displaced person, other corresponding terms

Article 2: outlines goals of the Convention

Article 3: describes duties, responsibilities of the Convention

Articles 4 and 10: describes strategies for the prevention of displacement within the African continent

Articles 5, 6, 7, 8, and 9: describes facets of support and aid related to displacement

Article 10: discusses displacement related to or stemming from development

Article 11: outlines a resolution for displacement

Article 12: discusses ways to combat the effects of displacement for affected individuals and groups

Article 13: relates documentation facet of issue

Articles 14, 15, 16, 17, 18, 19, 20, 21, 22, and 23: outlines policy mechanisms and operations related internally displaced persons

== Impact ==
After its adoption, it became the first regional treaty on internal displacement of its kind in the World. It has been widely accepted that the Convention's terms, regulations, and definitions have greatly expanded upon formerly utilized and related legal documents and treaties, especially the 1998 Guiding Principles on Internal Displacement. Despite this, it was estimated in 2018 by the United Nations Higher Commission on Refugees that seven of the top ten countries with the highest IDP populations were in Africa. Many countries with large IDP populations, including Sudan, have not yet arrived at ratifying the Convention and/or implementing similar legislation and policy.

Lately, increased attention has been given to the issue of IDPs across the African continent. Official African Union conferences and workshops related to the Kampala Convention have taken place since 2016. This includes the Conference of States party to the Kampala Convention in Harare, Zimbabwe, occurring in 2017, resulting in the Harare Plan of Action— a guiding document for Convention implementation. Furthermore, in 2018 the AU adopted a “model law” on the Convention, a document accessible by States and to be used in the drafting and formalization of domestic legislation and policies related to the Convention and its goals.

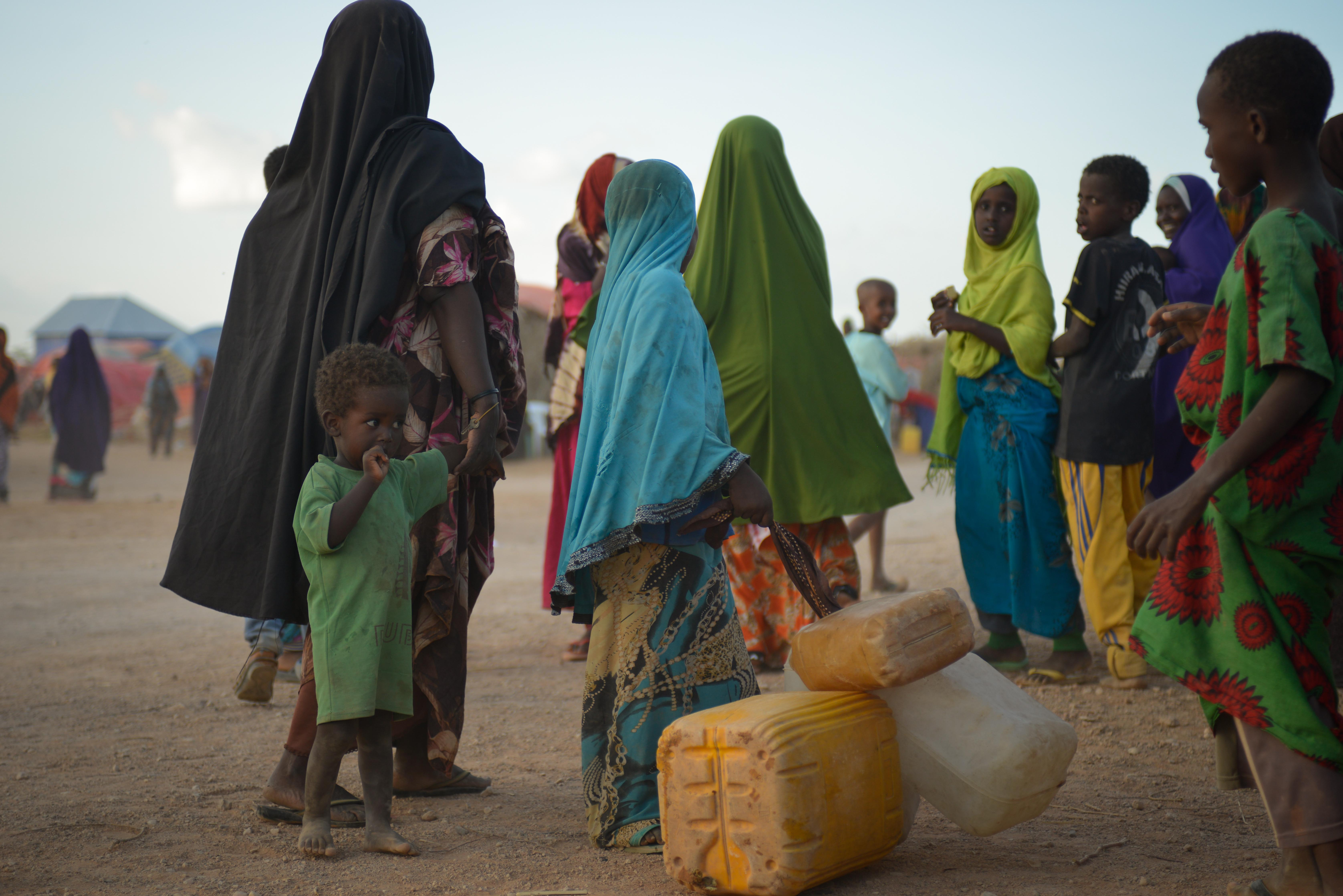
Women and children line up outside a water distribution area in an IDP camp in Hiran, Somalia, in 2016. The implications of the Kampala treaty for women and special populations have recently been emphasized in scholarly and international organization analyses of the Convention.

2019 was designated by the African Union as the ‘Year of Refugees, Returnees, and Internally Displaced Persons’— with many states in recent years ratifying and becoming closer to ratifying the Convention and/or adopting similar domestic policies, and/or creating separate bodies to coordinate responses promoted by the Convention. It has also been further included and implicated in many important policy frameworks for the African continent, including the Migration Policy Framework for 2018-2030, and the Agenda 2063 framework produced by the AU in 2015.

=== Criticism, debate ===
Although ratification of the Convention has occurred in most African Union states, questions related to the larger and more pivotal enforcement execution processes have been raised— including in nations such as Nigeria, in which over one million IDPs reside. Reports generated by the International Committee for the Red Cross, focusing on the periods of 2016-2019 and emphasizing primarily domestic policy related to the Convention, have corroborated this as well— largely determining that most of the action taken by States since the adoption of the Convention have focused on prevention, framework-building, and management response, and less on data collection, enforcement, and implementation. In this light, emphasis on active engagement, interaction, and inclusion of IDP communities in the drafting, revision, and implementation of Convention policies has been put in place by legislation and frameworks enacted by several states that have ratified the Convention recently.

Special populations face and continue to face many unique problems related to their status and condition. Scholarly studies and articles have concluded that women and children experience unique forms of hardship in the context of regional, national, and supranational conflict. Critics of the Kampala Convention and the African Union's action in this respect have pointed to restrictions and constraints in the field of equal protection under the Convention, especially considering a gendered view of this situation. The Norwegian Refugee Council has also echoed these sentiments— adding that full consideration and analytic and developmental measures should be taken by the States to ensure the women and girls benefit from the Convention, especially in the fields of housing and property ownership.

== See also ==
- United Nations High Commissioner for Refugees
- Internally displaced person
- African Union
- Refugee
- International Committee of the Red Cross
