= Internal Displacement Monitoring Centre =

- Abbreviation: IDMC
- Formation: 1998; 28 years ago
- Type: NGO
- Headquarters: Geneva, Switzerland
- Parent organization: Norwegian Refugee Council
- Website: internal-displacement.org

The Internal Displacement Monitoring Centre or IDMC is an international non-governmental organization established in 1998 as part of the Norwegian Refugee Council in Geneva.

It is focused on monitoring and providing data, analysis and expertise on internal displacement to inform policy and operational decisions that can improve the lives of internally displaced persons (IDPs) worldwide and reduce the risk of future displacement.

== Work ==
The IDMC contributes to improving national and international capacities to generate, analyse and use data to prevent, respond to an develop long-term solutions to internal displacement. IDMC also provides research into the drivers, impacts and costs of internal displacement.

In 2026, the IDMC reported over 82 million internally displaced persons worldwide as of the end of 2025.

== Funding ==
IDMC is funded by the Asian Development Bank, the Norwegian Ministry of Foreign Affairs, the Swedish International Development Cooperation Agency, the Liechtenstein Ministry of Foreign Affairs, the European Union, the Robert Bosch Stiftung and the German Federal Foreign Office.
