= Steve Dennis (humanitarian) =

Canadian humanitarian

Steven Patrick Dennis, known as Steve Dennis, is a Canadian humanitarian worker who in 2012 was violently abducted from Dadaab refugee camp, Kenya, before being rescued in a gunfight by an armed militia. Dennis' litigation against his employer was the first time that a European court has ruled on the duty of care of aid workers.

== Personal life ==
Steven Patrick Dennis is from Richmond Hill, near Toronto. His parents are Carol-Ann and Peter Dennis. Dennis' partner is Sara McHattie.

== Humanitarian career ==
Prior to working Dadaab refugee camp, Dennis has worked in humanitarian aid for ten years in Chad, Ivory Coast, Sri Lanka, South Sudan and Somalia, mostly for Médecins Sans Frontières.

== Events in Kenya and Somalia ==
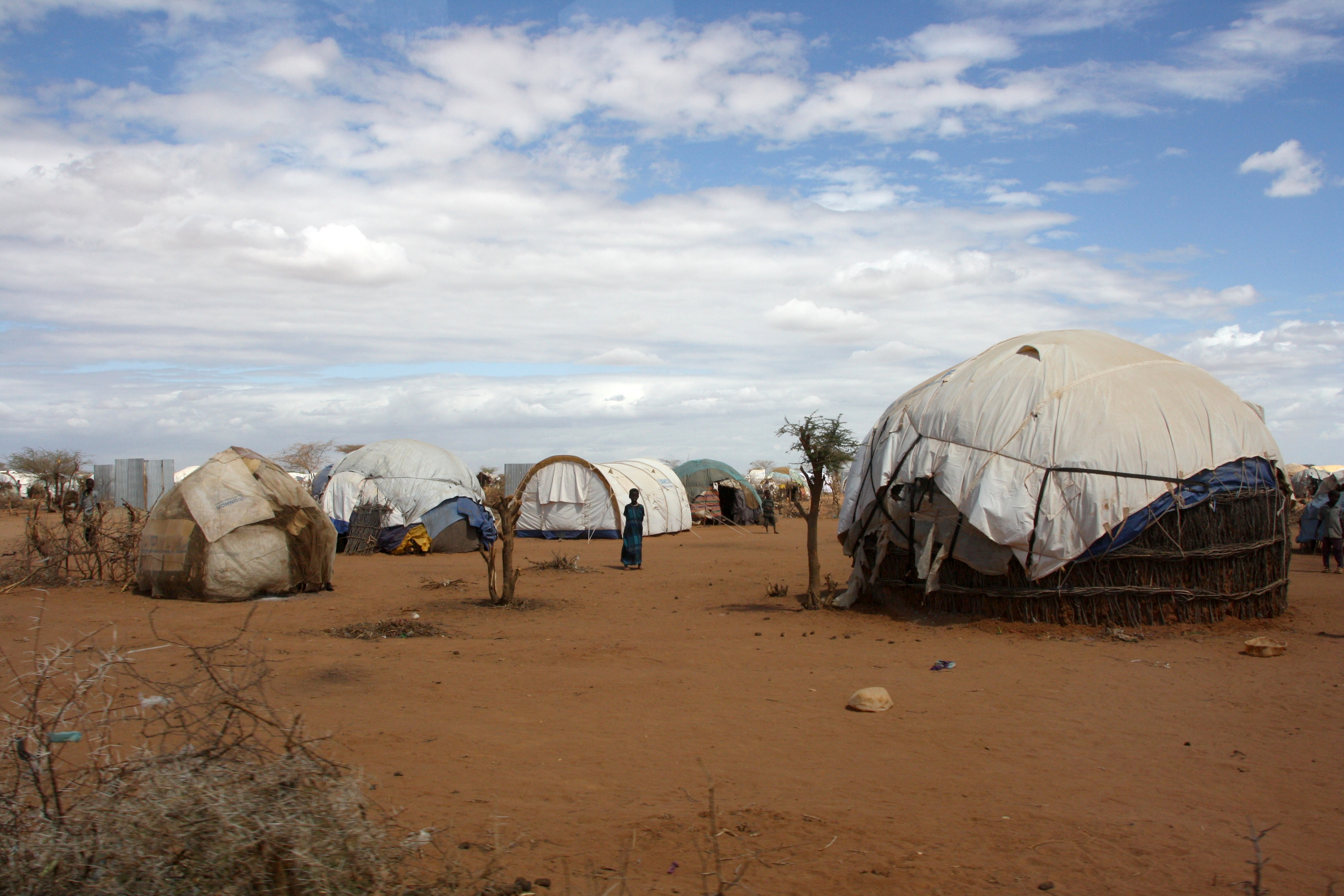
Dadaab refugee camp, July 2011

Dennis, while aged 37, was employed by Norwegian Refugee Council as a project manager in Dadaab, which, at the time, was one of the world's largest refugee camps. On June 29, 2012, the Norwegian Refugee Council secretary general Elisabeth Rasmusson landed in Dadaab with communications officer Astrid Sehl on a UNHAS plane as part of a fundraising trip that was also designed to raise awareness of the situation. There had been both kidnappings and attempted kidnappings in the area prior to the events of 29 June 2012, including the abduction of two Médecins Sans Frontières staff from Dadaab refugee camp in October 2011 and the abduction of a driver employed by CARE in September the same year. The situation in the camp was tense. Bombs were sometimes heard and gunfire was common.

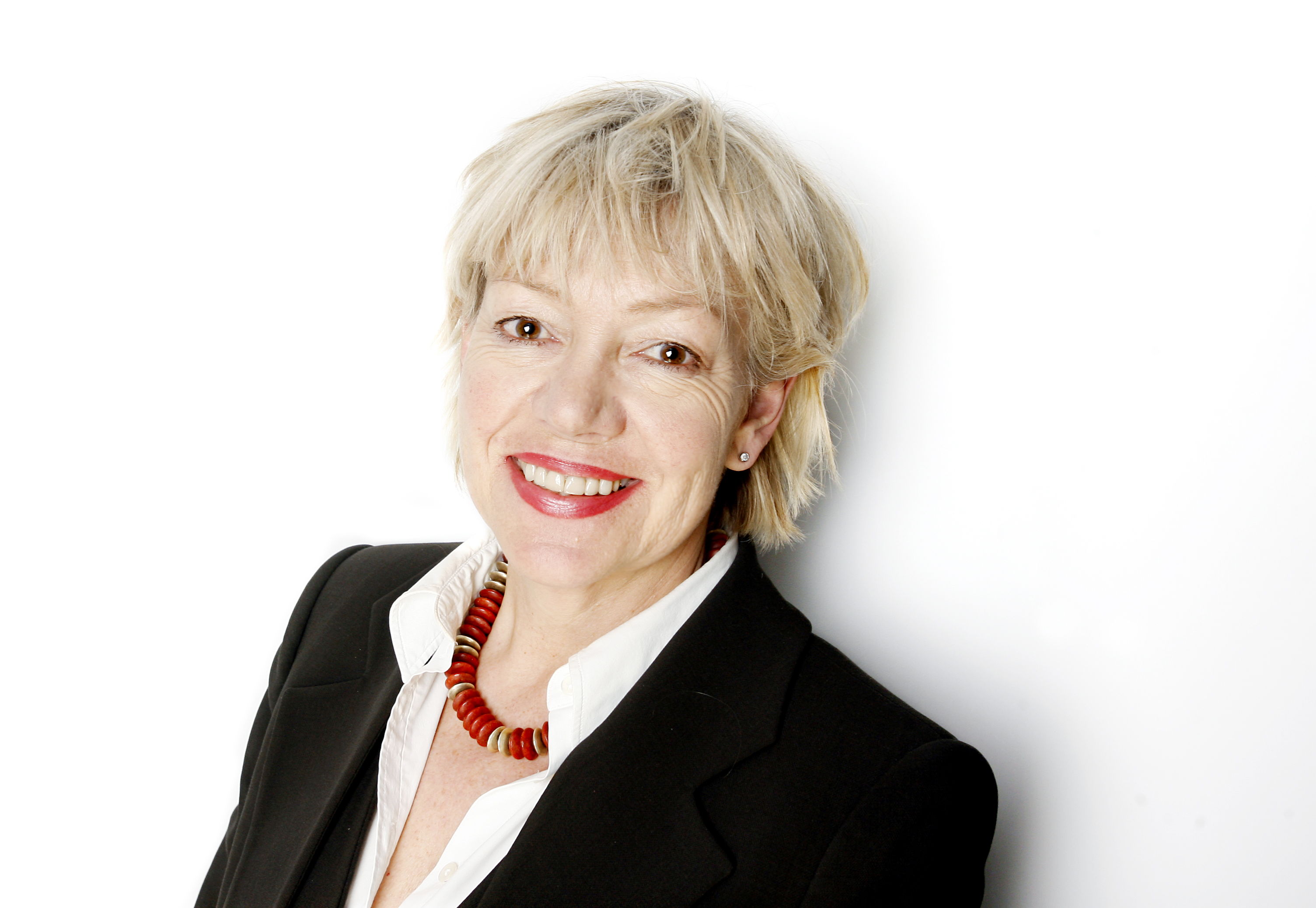
Elisabeth Rasmusson, Secretary General of the Norwegian Refugee Council

Dennis met Rasmusson and Sehl at the airport. Two suspicious men were spotted by a colleague at the airport gate, but there was no security officer to report the suspicions to. An armed police escort arrived to escort them, but the senior leaders of Norwegian Refugee Council changed their plans and rejected the support of the police.

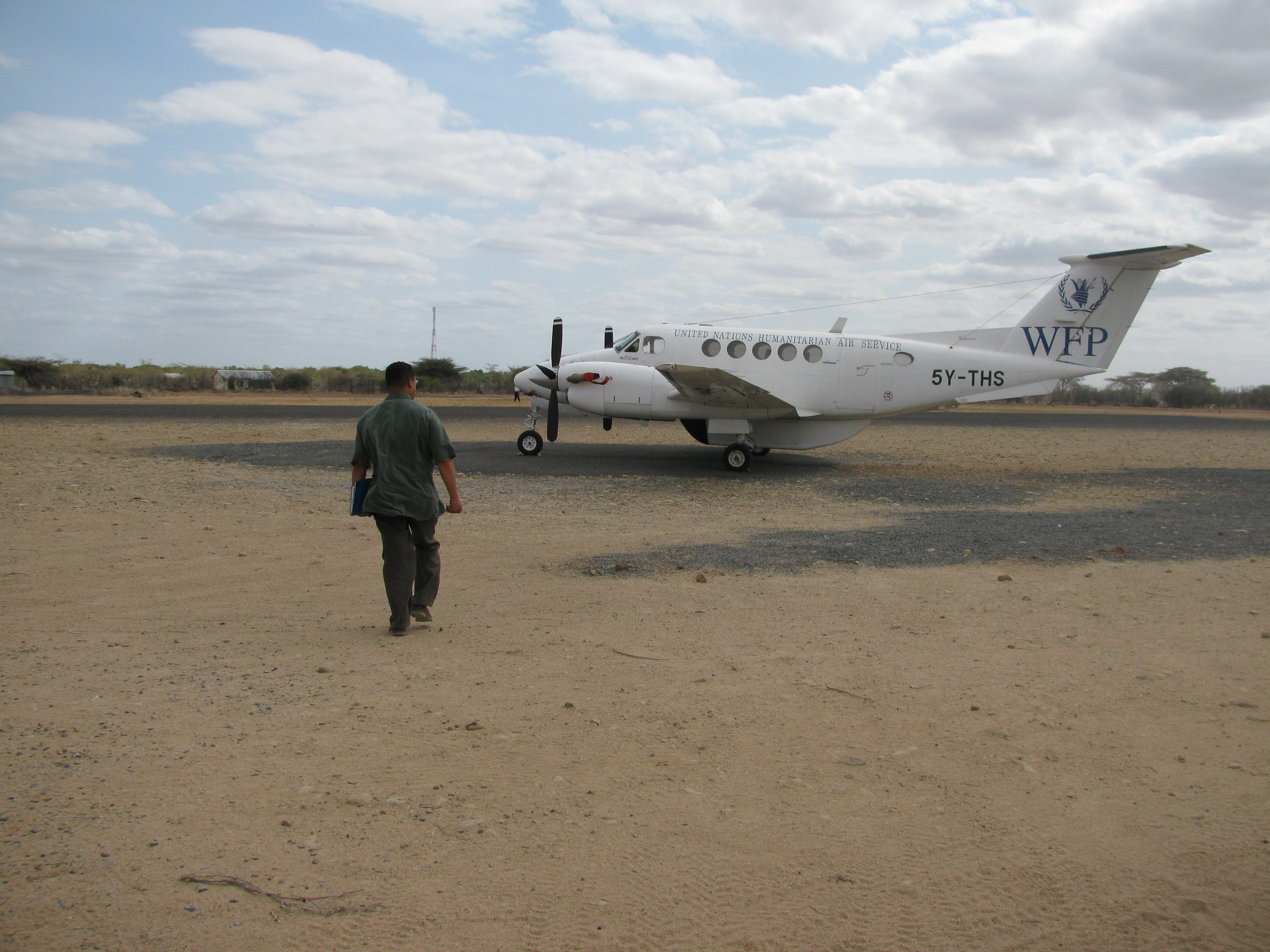
A UNHAS plane at Dadaad airstrip

Hassan Ibrahim, a Kenyan driver employed by the Norwegian Refugee Council, refused to drive in the absence of the police escort, citing the rules of his employment contract. Due to Ibrahim's refusal, a different driver, Abdi Ali was hired to replace him. A newly employed driver, Ali did not have the security training that the normal drivers had received.

The day started with the convoy of three vehicles transporting the delegation. Dennis travelled in the front vehicle, unaware that the purpose of this car was to act as a "lightning rod" to attract any gun or improved explosive devices attacks, instead of the other vehicle that was transporting the Secretary General. The 29 June was a Friday, which is typically not a work day in Dadaab, the decision bring in workers a Friday resulted in increased attention from all surrounding people due to the lack of any other activities occurring. The events took place in an area of the camp known as Ifo 2, the most dangerous part of Dadaab refugee camp.

The convoy of vehicles arrived at first destination at 0930, a food distribution warehouse where Norwegian Refugee Council staff met with representatives of the local refugee community, and then proceeded to another part of the camp where public latrines had been built. At the second location refugees pushed towards the car in order to speak to the leadership of Norwegian Refugee Council to discuss their unmet humanitarian needs. The delegation next went to the Norwegian Refugee Council office and observed a brick-manufacturing plant, discussed the manufacturing, posed for photos, and did a tree planting ceremony.

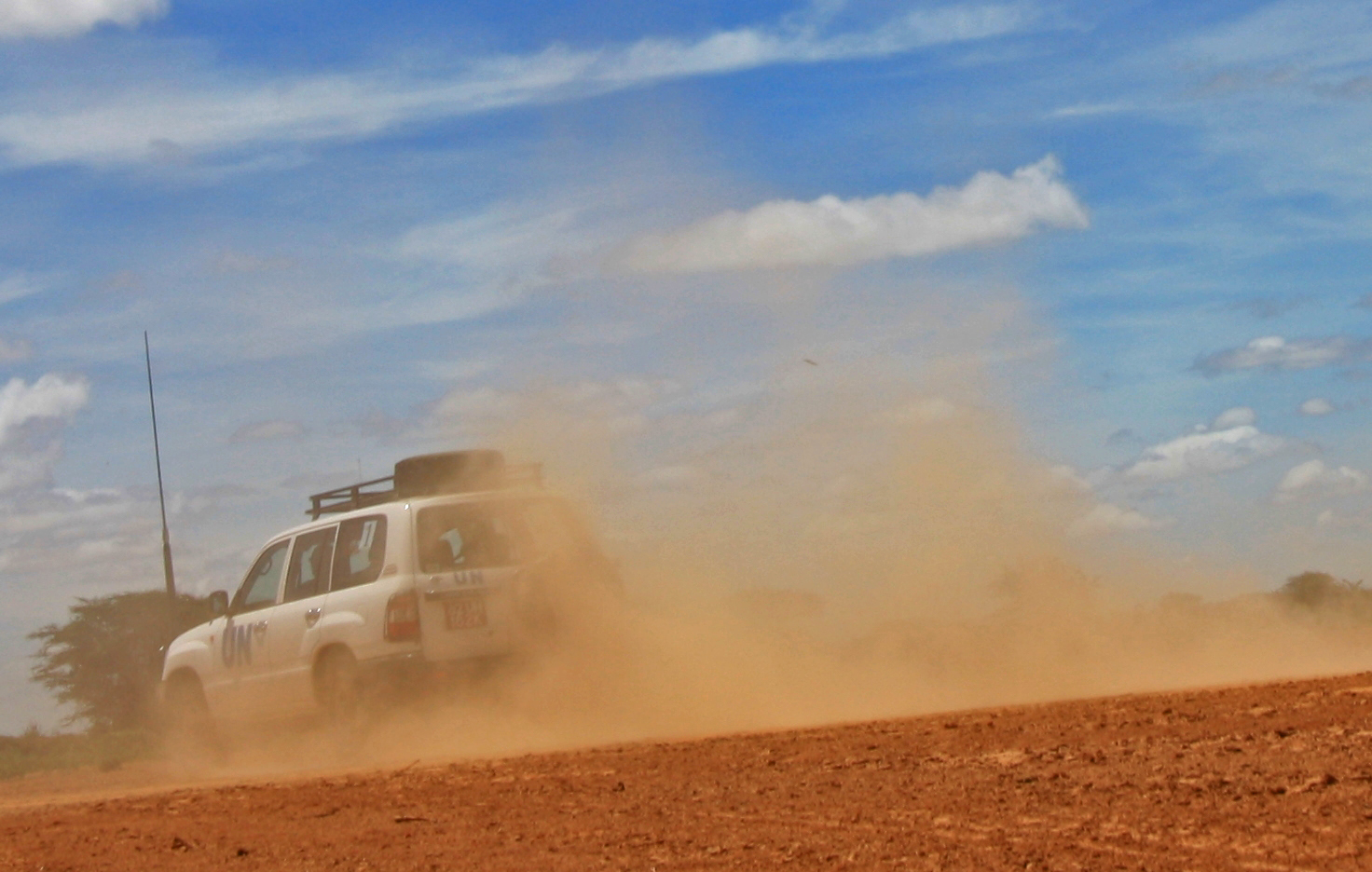
A United Nations Toyota Landcruiser, similar to the ones used by Norwegian Refugee Council, at Dadaab refugee camp

=== Abduction ===
After the Friday afternoon prayers, the convoy left the Norwegian Refugee Council office and travelled down a narrow road, with a razor wire fence on each side. Six gunmen opened fire on the convoy of three vehicles. The driver of the first vehicle with Dennis in it tried to accelerate away from the gunmen, but could not get traction in the sand. He then tried to reverse the vehicle, but got caught in a razor wire fence and was shot, non-fatally, twice in the back. Ali, the newly hired driver of the third vehicle, with Sehl in it, was struck by four bullets and died immediately behind the steering wheel. Another bullet struck Dennis in his thigh, after first passing through his wallet. Glenn Costes, the Filipino project manager was shot in the leg, causing severe internal injuries. The gunmen moved Dennis and three other colleagues into the rear vehicle, stealing the vehicle and abducting the four staff. The car with Rasmusson, driven by a driver with security training, escaped. The vehicle with the hostages stopped to collect two more men and supplies.

The gunmen, with the four hostages, travelled at high speed through the refugee camp. In addition to Dennis, the other abductees were Sehl, aged 33, Canadian country director Qurat-Ul-Ain Sadazai, aged 38, and Filipino project manager Glenn Costes, aged 40. After driving for some time, the kidnappers and abductees continued the journey by foot.

=== Immediate aftermath and rescue ===
Hours later, Rasmusson stated in a NRK interview that the area is regarded as totally safe, that they did not need a security escort and followed all security rules.

The four hostages walked for hours, escorted by eight armed men for three nights. Despite the leg injuries to Dennis and others, the abductors struck the hostages when they walked slowly. Walking in the moonlight through bushes, thorns struck the abductees in their faces and punctured the soles of their shoes. Fearing abuse, the hostages stayed close together at all times. Dennis and the others were provided with water to drink.

During the abduction, the Government of Canada kept Dennis' parents updated.

Dennis and fellow abductees were rescued by the Kenyan-government-aligned Somali Ras Kamboni militia near Dhobley about 60 km into Somalia. The Oslo court ruling states that Norwegian Refugee Council commissioned the armed rescue, although the Norwegian Refugee Council deny this.

After the rescue, Dennis and his colleagues were flown by military helicopter from Dhobley to Nairobi on 2 July 2012 where they received health checkups.

=== Aftermath ===
Dennis was diagnosed with post-traumatic stress disorder, and suffers from insomnia, hyper vigilance and the effects of muscle loss from the gunshot wound. After some time, Norwegian Refugee Council stopped paying Dennis' medical bills.

Dennis became dissatisfied with the post-incident support from Norwegian Refugee Council. Sehl requested to Norwegian Refugee Council that they undertake an external evaluation of the incident, but they did not. She went to an open meeting and made her request in a more public manner, her request was met with strong negativity. She was terminated by Norwegian Refugee Council soon after and accused of being a "trouble maker."

Norwegian Refugee Council undertook an internal review of the incident which produced 130 recommendations to improve the safety and security of their work. Dennis was not satisfied with the findings of the review and commenced litigation against the Norwegian Refugee Council.

== Litigation ==
After a crowdfunding to pay his legal costs, and unsuccessful attempts at a settlement, Dennis took Norwegian Refugee Council to court. Dennis was represented by lawyer Knut Helge Hurum. Norwegian Refugee Council was represented by Grethe Lillian Gullhaug.

Litigation commenced 23 February 2015 in the Oslo District Court and lasted seven days.

Dennis pursued three claims: "1. Compensation under the employer’s liability rule (section 2-1 of the Compensation Act); 2. Compensation for pain and suffering (section 3-5 of the Compensation Act); 3. Strict liability."

The judge described the kidnapping as "foreseeable" and that better mitigation measures could have been implemented to reduce the risk. The court found that Norwegian Refugee Council lacked a sufficient understanding of the risk and identified "weaknesses with regards to the identification and implementation of mitigating measures, particularly in relation to the decision to not use an armed escort, which was contrary to existing practice and security recommendations for Dadaab at the time". It concluded that Norwegian Refugee Council exhibited gross negligence it awarded them to pay approximately 4.4 million Norwegian Krone (approximately 465,000 EUR)." Norwegian Refugee Council decided not to appeal the finding.

The court also found that there was no basis to apply a more lenient duty of care for staff working for aid agencies.

== Lasting effects of the court case ==
Security specialist Steve McCann, of Safer Edge said: "The case’s significance lies not in the uniqueness of the incident, but in fact it has put the issue of security in the industry under public scrutiny."

The European Interagency Security Forum's stated in 2016 that the court's judgement clarified that humanitarian agencies do have a duty of care to their employees, just as any other type of employer has.

The court case was described as a "wake up call for the aid industry" by The New Humanitarian in 2015 and prompted aid agencies to review their procedures, especially with regards to care for staff after incidents.

Dennis' actions were described by Brendan McDonald of the Be Well Serve Well camping as breaking a taboo "Few have the courage to speak out about anxiety, post-traumatic stress, depression and burnout."
