= Internally displaced person =

Person forced to leave their home who remains within their country

Internally displaced people
Total population
- 75.9 million (2023)

Regions with significant populations
- Sub-Saharan Africa: 34.8 million
- North Africa and Middle East: 15.3 million
- South Asia: 8.2 million
- Europe and Central Asia: 7.2 million
- Americas: 6.3 million
- East Asia and Pacific: 4.2 million

Internally displaced people due to conflict

Internally displaced persons from disasters

An internally displaced person (IDP) is someone who is forced to leave their home but who remains within their country's borders. They are often referred to as refugees, although they do not fall within the legal definitions of a refugee.

In 2022, it was estimated there were 70.5 million IDPs worldwide. The first year for which global statistics on IDPs are available was in 1989. As of 3 May 2022, the countries with the largest IDP populations were Ukraine (8 million), Syria (7.6 million), Sudan (7.3 million), Ethiopia (5.5 million), the Democratic Republic of the Congo (5.2 million), Colombia (4.9 million), Yemen (4.3 million), Afghanistan (3.8 million), Iraq (3.6 million), South Sudan (1.9 million), Pakistan (1.4 million), Nigeria (1.2 million) and Somalia (1.1 million). More than 85% of Palestinians in Gaza (1.9 million) were internally displaced as of January 2024.

The United Nations and the UNHCR support monitoring and analysis of worldwide IDPs through the Geneva-based Internal Displacement Monitoring Centre.

== Definition ==
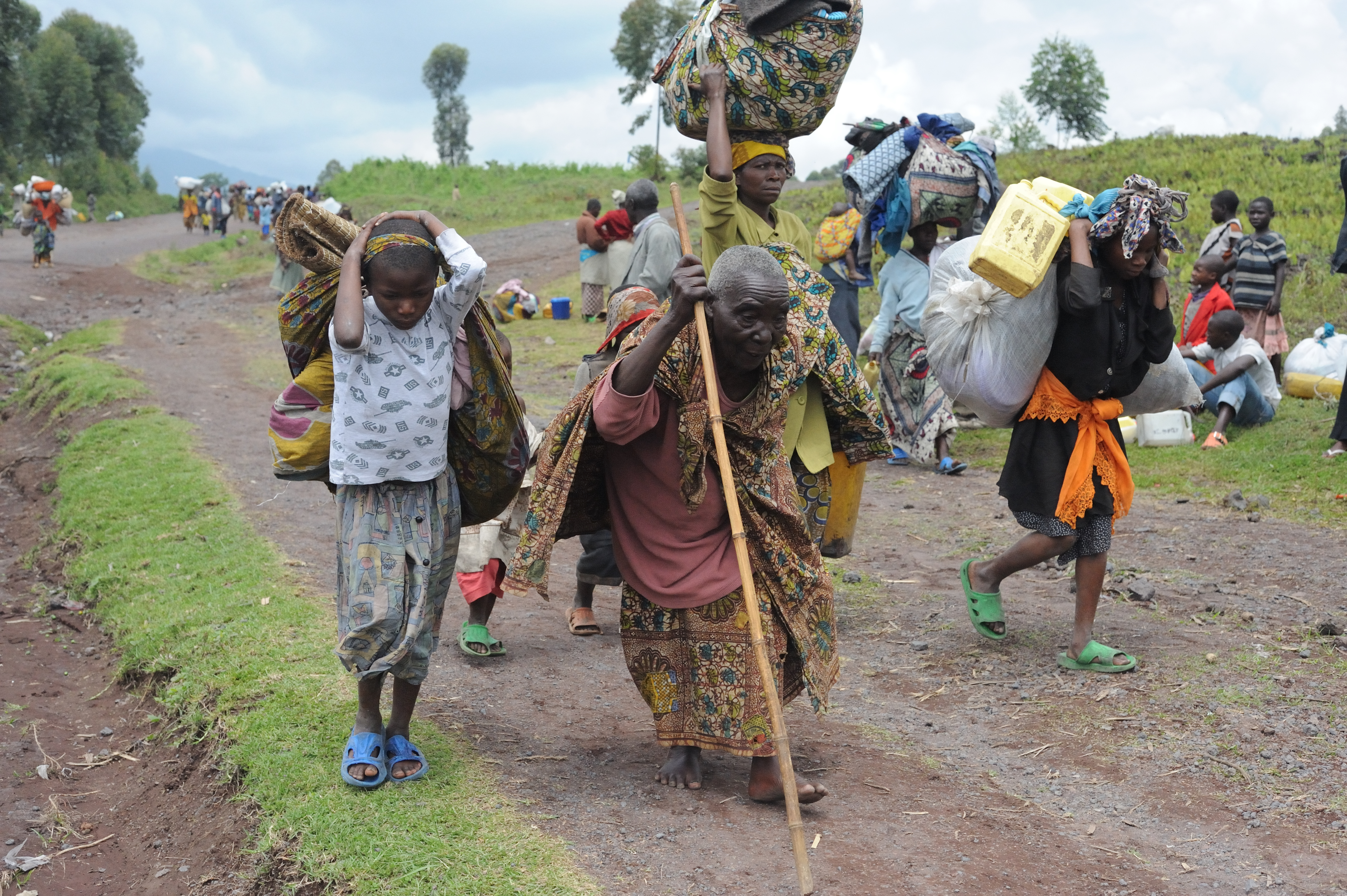
Villagers fleeing gunfire in a camp for internally displaced persons during the 2008 Nord-Kivu campaign

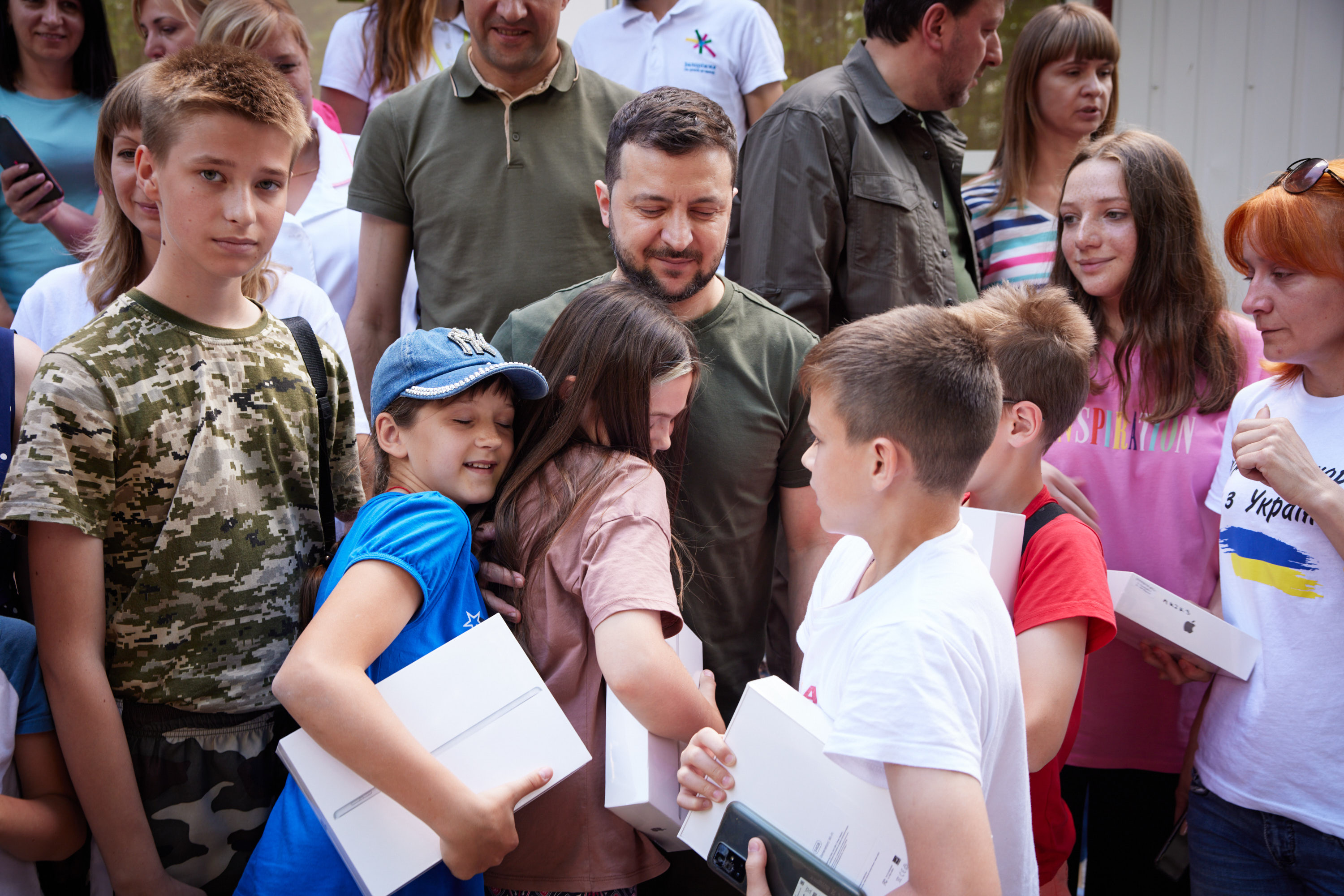
Ukrainian President Volodymyr Zelenskyy with internally displaced people during the Russian invasion of Ukraine

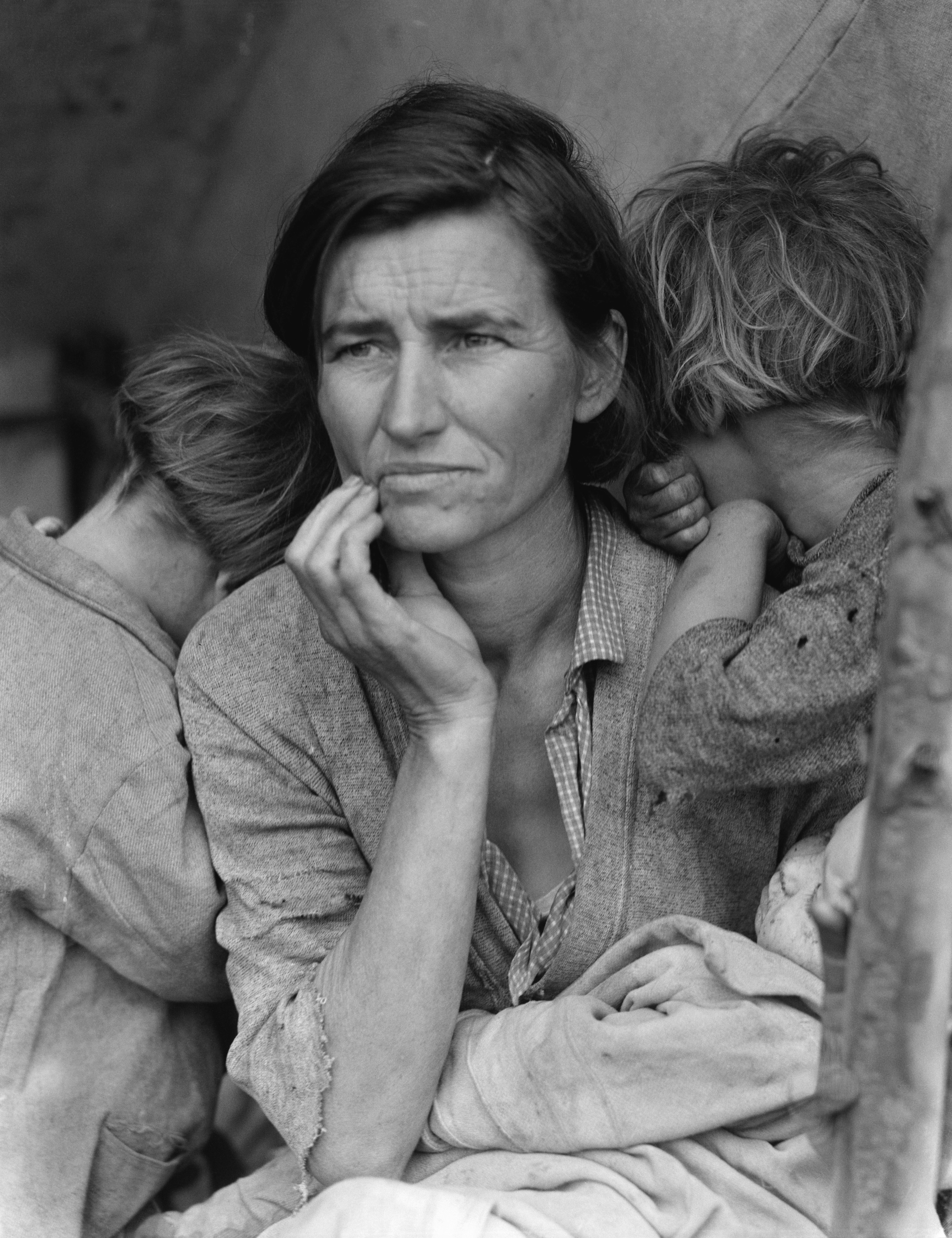
Migrant Mother, famous photo by Dorothea Lange of Florence Owens Thompson with her children during the Great Depression in 1936

Whereas 'refugee' has an authoritative definition under the 1951 Refugee Convention, there is no universal legal definition of internally displaced persons (IDP); only a regional treaty for African countries (see Kampala Convention). However, a United Nations report, Guiding Principles on Internal Displacement uses the definition of:

persons or groups of persons who have been forced or obliged to flee or to leave their homes or places of habitual residence, in particular as a result of or in order to avoid the effects of armed conflict, situations of generalized violence, violations of human rights or natural or human-made disasters, and who have not crossed an internationally recognized State border.

While the above stresses two important elements of internal displacement (coercion and the domestic/internal movement), rather than a strict definition the Guiding Principles offer "a descriptive identification of the category of persons whose needs are the concern of the Guiding Principles". In this way, the document "intentionally steers toward flexibility rather than legal precision" as the words "in particular" indicate that the list of reasons for displacement is not exhaustive. However, as Erin Mooney has pointed out, "global statistics on internal displacement generally count only IDPs uprooted by conflict and human rights violations. Moreover, a recent study has recommended that the IDP concept should be defined even more narrowly, to be limited to persons displaced by violence." This outlook has become outdated, however, as natural disasters and slow-onset climate degradation have become the primary driving force behind internal displacement in recent years, although conflict remains the primary reason for pre-existing IDPs overall. Climate displaced IDPs are therefore being given more attention overall through being recorded in statistics. Thus, despite the non-exhaustive reasons for internal displacement, many consider IDPs as those who would be defined as refugees if they were to cross an international border, hence, the term refugees in all but the name is often applied to IDPs.

== IDP populations ==
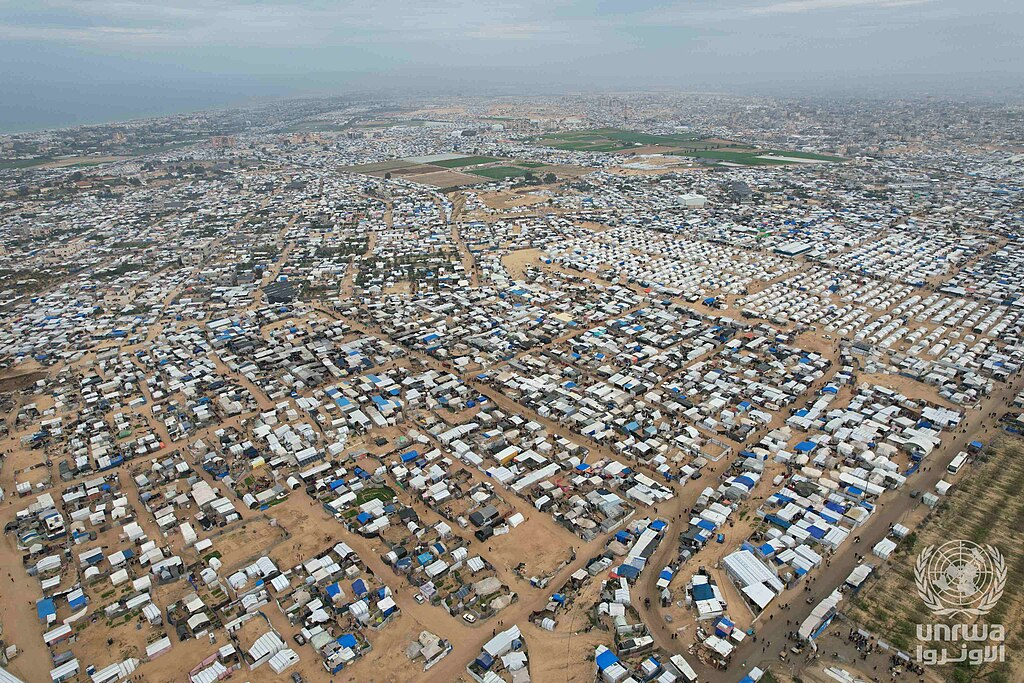
UNRWA camp of Al-Mawasi, where displaced Palestinians live in tents to flee the Israeli bombing of the Gaza Strip, January 22, 2025

It is very difficult to get accurate figures for internally displaced persons because populations are not constant. IDPs may be returning home while others are fleeing, and others may periodically return to IDP camps to take advantage of humanitarian aid. While the case of IDPs in large camps such as those in Darfur, western Sudan, are relatively well-reported, it is very difficult to assess those IDPs who flee to larger towns and cities. It is necessary for many instances to supplement official figures with additional information obtained from operational humanitarian organizations on the ground. Thus, the 24.5 million figure must be treated as an estimate. Additionally, most official figures only include those displaced by conflict or natural disasters. Development-induced IDPs often are not included in assessments. It has been estimated that between 70 and 80% of all IDPs are women and children.

50% of internally displaced people and refugees were thought to be in urban areas in 2010, many of them in protracted displacement with little likelihood of ever returning home. A 2013 study found that these protracted urban displacements had not been given due weight by international aid and governance as historically they had focused on rural displacement responses. The study argues that this protracted urban displacement needs a fundamental change in the approach to those who are displaced and their host societies. They note that re-framing responses to urban displacement will also involve human rights and development actors and local and national governments. They call for a change in the narrative around the issue is needed to reflect ingenuity and fortitude displayed by displaced populations, the opportunities for self-sufficiency and safety represented by urban areas, and that the displaced can make a contribution to their host societies. An updated country by country breakdown can be found online.

=== Latest IDP population ===
The following table is a list of countries and territories by the number of Internally Displaced People (IDPs). According to Internal Displacement Monitoring Centre (IDMC), the internal displacement figures refer to the number of forced movements of people within the borders of their country recorded during the year, and may include individuals who have been displaced more than once. The total number of IDPs is a snapshot of all the people living in internal displacements at the end of the year, and is the sum of the number of conflict IDPs and disaster IDPs.

Internal Displacement Monitoring Centre (IDMC) (2022)
Country / Territory	Conflict Internal Displacement	Conflict IDPs	Disaster Internal Displacement	Disaster IDPs	Total IDPs
Afghanistan	32,000	3,444,000	220,000	2,482,000	5,926,000
Albania			320		
Algeria			2,000	1,500	1,500
American Samoa			59	26	26
Angola			1,800		
Argentina			730		
Armenia	7,600	8,400			8,400
Australia			17,000	9,900	9,900
Azerbaijan		659,000	190		659,000
Bangladesh	560	427,000	1,524,000	8,600	435,600
Belgium			100		
Belize			5,100	820	820
Benin	1,200	1,200	6,900	6,900	8,100
Bolivia			3,000	650	650
Bosnia and Herzegovina		91,000	78	58	91,058
Brazil	5,600	5,600	708,000	44,000	49,600
Bulgaria			900	14	14
Burkina Faso	438,000	1,882,000	2,400		1,882,000
Burundi	600	8,500	13,000	67,000	75,500
Cambodia			28,000	3,900	3,900
Cameroon	139,000	987,000	66,000	23,000	1,010,000
Canada			15,000	280	280
Central African Republic	290,000	516,000	77,000		516,000
Chad	80,000	300,000	158,000		300,000
Chile			1,500	1,500	1,500
China			3,632,000	146,000	146,000
Colombia	339,000	4,766,000	281,000	41,000	4,807,000
Congo		27,000	42,000	201,000	228,000
Cook Islands			7		
Costa Rica			1,600		
Croatia			100	38	38
Cuba			90,000		
Cyprus		246,000	54		246,000
DR Congo	4,004,000	5,686,000	423,000	283,000	5,969,000
Denmark			20		
Djibouti			6,100		
Dominican Republic			54,000	7,900	7,900
Ecuador			6,400	2,200	2,200
El Salvador	73,000	52,000	4,600		52,000
Eswatini			360	360	360
Ethiopia	2,032,000	3,852,000	873,000	717,000	4,569,000
Fiji			4,800	400	400
Finland			8		
France			45,000	44	44
French Polynesia			17		
Gambia	7,800	5,600	7,000		5,600
Georgia		308,000	430	31,000	339,000
Germany			630		
Ghana			2,700	5,900	5,900
Greece			710	60	60
Guadeloupe			140		
Guatemala	5	242,000	74,000	7,900	249,900
Guinea			340		
Guyana			120		
Haiti	106,000	171,000	15,000	24,000	195,000
Honduras	260	247,000	46,000	3,900	250,900
Hong Kong			330		
Iceland			56		
India	1,000	631,000	2,507,000	32,000	663,000
Indonesia	7,100	72,000	308,000	68,000	140,000
Iran			42,000	390	390
Iraq	32,000	1,169,000	51,000	69,000	1,238,000
Ireland			26		
Israel	1,100				
Italy			4,100	300	300
Ivory Coast		302,000	2,500		302,000
Japan			51,000	45,000	6,000
Kazakhstan	120	120	4,000	14	134
Kenya	15,000	30,000	318,000	373,000	403,000
Kosovo		16,000	120		16,000
Kuwait			14		
Kyrgyzstan	166,000	4,000	1,700	4	4,004
Laos			560	560	560
Latvia			27		
Lebanon			35		
Libya	360	135,000			135,000
Madagascar		2,800	291,000	68,000	70,800
Malawi			297,000		
Malaysia			156,000	680	680
Maldives			370		
Mali	154,000	380,000	24,000	32,000	412,000
Marshall Islands			28	28	28
Mauritania			23,000	23,000	23,000
Mauritius			140		
Mayotte		8			8
Mexico	9,200	386,000	11,000	3,600	389,600
Mongolia			75	75	75
Morocco			9,500		
Mozambique	283,000	1,030,000	113,000	127,000	1,157,000
Myanmar	1,006,000	1,498,000	13,000	3,000	1,501,000
Nepal			93,000	58,000	58,000
New Caledonia		150	170		150
New Zealand			2,800	150	150
Nicaragua		77	16,000	11	88
Niger	101,000	372,000	248,000	5,100	377,100
Nigeria	148,000	3,646,000	2,437,000	854,000	4,500,000
North Korea			200		
North Macedonia		110			110
Norway			170		
Oman			45		
Pakistan	680	21,000	8,168,000	1,025,000	1,046,000
Palestine	1,800	12,000	250		12,000
Panama			460		
Papua New Guinea	64,000	94,000	9,600	190	94,190
Peru		73,000	24,000	29,000	102,000
Philippines	123,000	102,000	5,453,000	533,000	635,000
Portugal			4,500	3	3
Puerto Rico			49,000	58	58
Romania			160		
Russia	7,100	7,500	2,700	28	7,528
Rwanda			7,800	3,600	3,600
Samoa			14		
São Tomé and Principe			240		
Senegal		8,400	12,000	460	8,860
Serbia		195,000	1		195,000
Sierra Leone		3,000	800		3,000
Slovenia			500		
Solomon Islands		1,000	11	11	1,011
Somalia	621,000	3,864,000	1,152,000		3,864,000
South Africa			62,000	220	220
South Korea			30,000	5,100	5,100
South Sudan	337,000	1,475,000	596,000	665,000	2,140,000
Spain			31,000	10	10
Sri Lanka		12,000	11,000	23	12,023
Saint Lucia			560		
Saint Vincent and the Grenadines			3	3	3
Sudan	314,000	3,553,000	105,000	227,000	3,780,000
Suriname			1,500		
Switzerland			66	4	4
Syria	171,000	6,865,000	21,000		6,865,000
Taiwan			1,700		
Tajikistan			260	18	18
Tanzania			4,200	2,200	2,200
Thailand		41,000	22,000	680	41,680
Togo	2,300	2,300	16,000	4,700	7,000
Tonga			2,400	260	260
Trinidad and Tobago			40	7	7
Tunisia			2,000		
Turkey		1,099,000	6,900	52	1,099,052
Turks and Caicos Islands			160		
Uganda	2,000	4,800	34,000	38,000	42,800
Ukraine	16,870,000	5,914,000	1		5,914,000
United Kingdom			1,900	80	80
United States			675,000	543,000	543,000
Uruguay			800		
Uzbekistan			170		
Vanuatu			390		
Venezuela			13,000	9,900	9,900
Vietnam			353,000	2,200	2,200
Yemen	276,000	4,523,000	171,000		4,523,000
Zambia			3,600	3,600	3,600
Zimbabwe			1,300		
Total	28,270,385	61,476,565	32,541,165	8,978,169	70,454,734

=== Historical IDP populations ===
UNHCR registered IDPs and people in IDP-like situations by country/territory between 2007 and 2014
Country/territory	2007	2008	2009	2010	2011	2012	2013	2014
Afghanistan	129,300	153,700	230,700	297,100	351,900	447,500	486,300	631,300
Azerbaijan	686,600	686,600	603,300	586,000	592,900	599,200	600,300	609,000
Bosnia and Herzegovina	135,500	131,000	124,500	113,600	113,400	113,000	103,400	84,500
Burundi	13,900	100,000	100,000	100,000	157,200	78,800	78,900	78,900
CAR	147,000	197,000	197,000	197,000	192,500	106,200	51,700	894,400
Chad	112,700	178,900	166,700	170,500	231,000	124,000	90,000	19,800
Colombia	3,000,000	3,000,000	3,000,000	3,304,000	3,672,100	3,888,300	3,943,500	5,368,100
Congo	3,500							
Croatia	4,000	2,900	2,500	2,300	2,100			
DRC	1,075,300	1,317,900	1,460,100	2,050,700	1,721,400	1,709,300	2,669,100	2,963,800
Georgia	246,000	271,300	329,800	352,600	360,000	274,000	279,800	257,600
Iraq	1,834,400	2,481,000	2,647,300	1,552,000	1,343,600	1,332,400	1,131,800	954,100
Ivory Coast	709,200	709,000	686,000	519,100	517,100	126,700	45,000	24,000
Kenya		250,000	404,000	399,000	300,000	300,000		
Kyrgyzstan					80,000	163,900		
Lebanon	200,000	70,000						
Libya						93,600	59,400	53,600
Mali							227,900	254,800
Montenegro	16,200	16,200						
Myanmar	58,500	67,300	67,300	62,000	239,200	339,200	430,400	372,000
Nepal	100,000	50,000						
Nigeria								360,000
Pakistan		155,800	155,800	1,894,600	952,000	452,900	758,000	747,500
Philippines					139,500	159,500	1,200	117,400
Russia	158,900	263,700	91,500	79,900	75,400			
Serbia	227,600	226,400	225,900	224,900	228,400	228,200	227,800	227,500
Somalia	400,000	1,000,000	1,277,200	1,392,300	1,463,800	1,356,800	1,133,000	1,133,000
South Sudan					223,700	209,700	345,700	331,100
Sri Lanka	469,000	459,600	504,800	434,900	273,800	138,400	93,500	42,200
Sudan	1,325,200	1,225,000	1,201,000	1,079,100	1,602,200	2,033,100	1,873,300	1,873,300
Syria							2,016,500	6,520,800
Timor-Leste	155,200	62,600	15,900					
Uganda	1,814,900	1,236,000	853,000	428,600	125,600			
Yemen		77,000	100,000	250,000	193,700	347,300	385,300	306,600
Zimbabwe						54,300	57,900	60,100
Country/territory	2007	2008	2009	2010	2011	2012	2013	2014

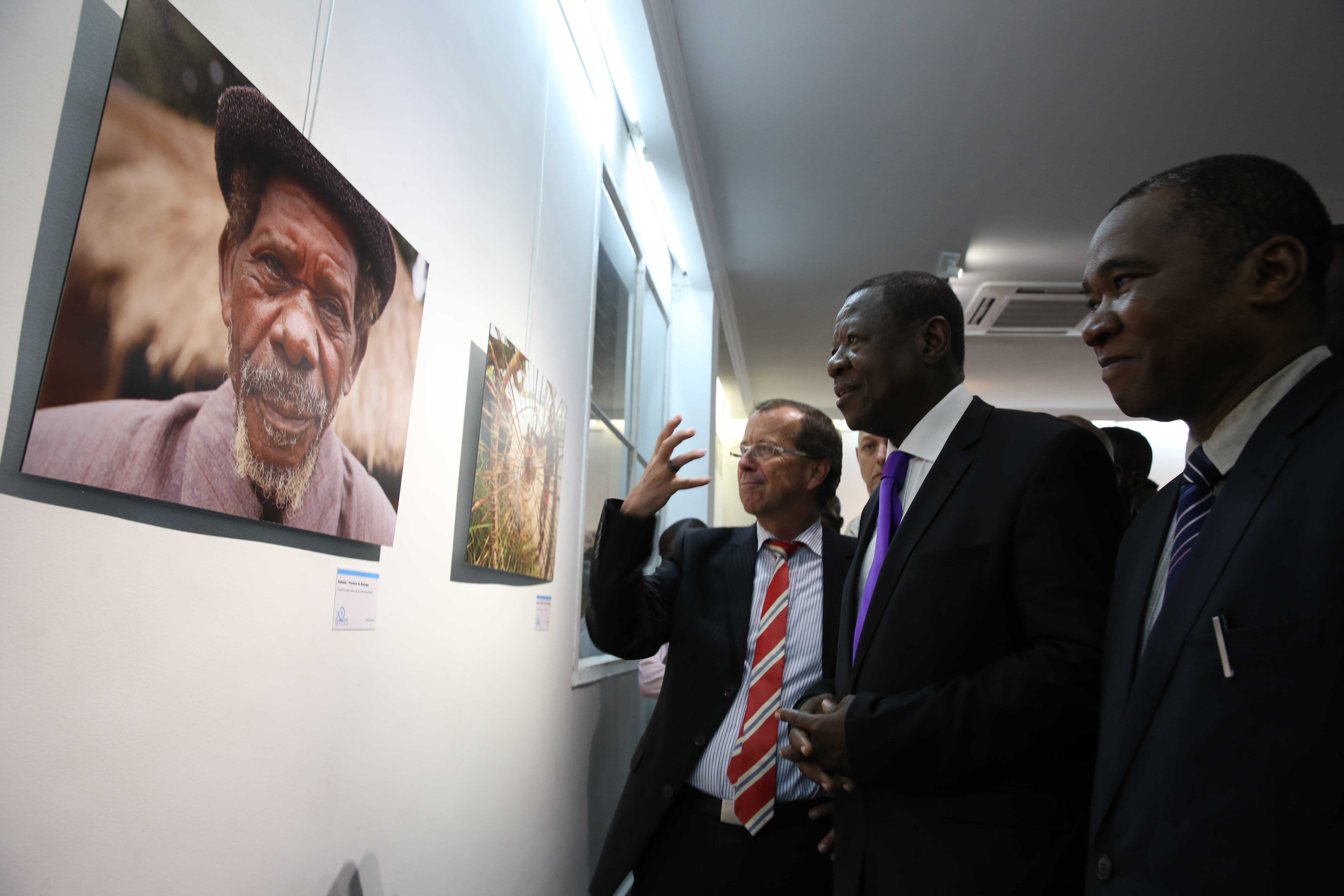
Official opening of MONUSCO's photo exhibition organized in the framework of the 70th anniversary of the United Nations. In the photo are the Head of MONUSCO, Martin Kobler (1st left), Lambert Mende (middle), and the Director of MONUSCO Public Information Division, Charles Antoine Bambara, commenting on a picture showing an internally displaced person.

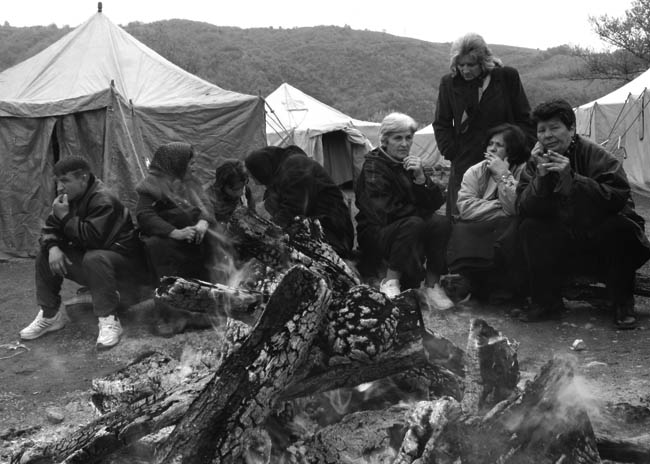
Serbian and other non-Albanian refugees during Kosovo War. Serbia is home to highest number of refugees and IDPs in Europe.

== Protection and assistance ==
The problem of protecting and assisting IDPs is not a new issue. In international law it is the responsibility of the government concerned to provide assistance and protection for the IDPs in their country. However, as many of the displaced are a result of civil conflict and violence or where the authority of the central state is in doubt, there is no local authority willing to provide assistance and protection. It has been estimated that some 5 million IDPs in 11 countries are "without any significant humanitarian assistance from their governments." Under these circumstances rehabilitation policies on humanitarian grounds should be aimed at reducing inequality of opportunity among these vulnerable groups by integrating them into local social services and allowing them access to jobs, education, and healthcare opportunities; otherwise new conflicts might break out.

Unlike the case of refugees, there is no international humanitarian institution which has the overall responsibility of protecting and assisting the refugees as well as the internally displaced. A number of organizations have stepped into the breach in specific circumstances.

=== UNHCR ===
The Office of the United Nations High Commissioner for Refugees (UNHCR) was mandated by General Assembly Resolution 428 (V) of 14 December 1950 to "lead and coordinate international action for the worldwide protection of refugees and the resolution of refugee problems.... guided by the 1951 United Nations Convention Relating to the Status of Refugees and its 1967 Protocol." The UNHCR has traditionally argued that it does not have an exclusive mandate for IDPs even though at least since 1972 it had relief and rehabilitation programs for those displaced within a country. Until the mid-2000s, it conditioned involvement to cases where there is a specific request by the UN Secretary-General and with the consent of the State concerned it has been willing to respond by assisting IDPs in a given instance. In 2005 it was helping some 5.6 million IDPs (out of over 25 million), but only about 1.1 million in Africa.

In 2005, the UNHCR signed an agreement with other humanitarian agencies. "Under this agreement, UNHCR will assume the lead responsibility for protection, emergency shelter and camp management for internally displaced people." In 2019, UNHCR issued an updated IDP policy that reaffirms its commitment to engaging decisively and predictably in situations of internal displacement.

=== ICRC ===
The International Committee of the Red Cross has a mandate of ensuring the application of international humanitarian law as it affects civilians in the midst of armed conflict. They have traditionally not distinguished between civilians who are internally displaced and those who remain in their homes. In a 2006 policy statement, the ICRC stated:

The ICRC's overall objective is to alleviate the suffering of people who are caught up in armed conflict and other situations of violence. To that end, the organization strives to provide effective and efficient assistance and protection for such persons, be they displaced or not, while taking into consideration the action of other humanitarian organizations. On the basis of its long experience in different parts of the world, the ICRC has defined an operational approach towards the civilian population as a whole that is designed to meet the most urgent humanitarian needs of both displaced persons and local and host communities.

However, its Director of Operations has earlier recognized that IDPs "deprived of shelter and their habitual sources of food, water, medicine and money, they have different, and often more urgent, material needs."

=== Collaborative approach ===
The previous system set up internationally to address the needs of IDPs was referred to as the collaborative approach as the responsibility for protecting and assisting IDPs was shared among the UN agencies, i.e. UNHCR, Unicef, WFP, UNDP, Office of the High Commissioner for Human Rights, the International Organization for Migration (IOM), the ICRC and international NGOs. Coordination is the responsibility of the UN Emergency Relief Coordinator and the Humanitarian Coordinator in the country concerned. They are assisted by the Inter-Agency Displacement Division, which was created in 2004 and is housed in the UN Office for the Coordination of Humanitarian Affairs (OCHA).

The original collaborative approach has come under increasing criticism. Roberta Cohen reports:

Nearly every UN and independent evaluation has found the collaborative approach deficient when it comes to IDPs. To begin with, there is no real focus of responsibility in the field for assisting and protecting... There is also no predictability of action, as the different agencies are free to pick and choose the situations in which they wish to become involved on the basis of their respective mandates, resources, and interests. In every new emergency, no one knows for sure which agency or combination thereof will become involved.

In 2005 there was an attempt to fix the problem by giving sectoral responsibilities to different humanitarian agencies, most notably with the UNHCR taking on the responsibility for the protection and the management of camps and emergency shelters. The Forced Migration Review stated that the "abnegation of responsibility is possible because there is no formal responsibility apportioned to agencies under the Collaborative Response, and thus no accountability when agencies renege on their promises."

Similarly, research on refugees has suggested a cross-sector collaboration as a key means to assist displaced people.

== Cluster approach ==
The cluster approach designates individual agencies as 'sector leaders' to coordinate operations in specific areas to try to plug those newly identified gaps. The cluster approach was conceived amid concerns about coordination and capacity that arose from the weak operational response to the crisis in Darfur in 2004 and 2005, and the critical findings of the Humanitarian Response Review (HRR) commissioned by the then ERC, Jan Egeland. Egeland called for strengthening the leadership of the sectors, and introduced the concept of "clusters" at different levels (headquarters, regional, country and operational)'.

The cluster approach operates on the global and local levels. At the global level, the approach is meant to build up capacity in eleven key 'gap' areas by developing better surge capacity, ensuring consistent access to appropriately trained technical expertise and enhanced material stockpiles, and securing the increased engagement of all relevant humanitarian partners. At the field level, the cluster approach strengthens the coordination and response capacity by mobilizing clusters of humanitarian agencies (UN/Red Cross-Red Crescent/IOs/NGOs) to respond in particular sectors or areas of activity, each cluster having a clearly designated and accountable lead, as agreed by the HC and the Country Team. Designated lead agencies at the global level both participate directly in operations, but also coordinate with and oversee other organizations within their specific spheres, reporting the results up through a designated chain of command to the ERC at the summit. However, lead agencies are responsible as "providers of last resort", which represents the commitment of cluster leads to do their utmost to ensure an adequate and appropriate response in their respective areas of responsibility. The cluster approach was part of a package of reforms accepted by the IASC in December 2005 and subsequently applied in eight chronic humanitarian crises and six sudden-onset emergencies. However, the reform was originally rolled out and evaluated in four countries: DRC, Liberia, Somalia and Uganda.

The clusters were originally concentrated in nine areas:

1. Logistics (WFP)
2. Emergency Telecommunications Cluster (WFP)
3. Camp Coordination and Camp Management (UNHCR for conflict-generated IDPs and IOM for natural disaster-generated IDPs)
4. Shelter (IFRC for natural disasters; UNHCR for conflict situations)
5. Health (WHO)
6. Nutrition (UNICEF)
7. Water, sanitation, and hygiene promotion (UNICEF)
8. Early recovery (UNDP); and
9. Protection (UNHCR for conflict-generated IDPs, UNHCR, UNICEF, and OHCHR for natural disaster-generated IDPs).

IASC Principles deemed it unnecessary to apply the cluster approach to four sectors where no significant gaps were detected: a) food, led by WFP; b) refugees, led by UNHCR; c) education, led by UNICEF; and d) agriculture, led by FAO.

The original nine clusters were later expanded to include agriculture and education.

== International law ==
Unlike the case of refugees, there is no international universal treaty which applies specifically to IDPs. Only a regional treaty for African countries has been established (see Kampala Convention). Some other countries have advocated re-thinking the definitions and protections for refugees to apply to IDPs, but so far no solid actions have come to fruition. Recognizing the gap, the UN Secretary-General, Boutros-Ghali appointed Francis Deng in 1992 as his representative for internally displaced persons. Besides acting as an advocate for IDPs, Deng set out in 1994, at the request of the UN General Assembly to examine and bring together existing international laws which relate to the protection of IDPs. The result of this work was the document, Guiding Principles on Internal Displacement.

The Guiding Principles lay out the responsibilities of states before displacement – that is, to prevent displacement – during and after displacement. They have been endorsed by the UN General Assembly, the African Commission on Human and People's Rights (ACHPR) and by the signatories to the 2006 Pact on Security, Stability and Development in the Great Lakes Region, which include Sudan, DRC and Uganda.

The Guiding Principles, however, are non-binding. As Bahame Tom Nyanduga, Special Rapporteur on Refugees, IDPs and Asylum Seekers in Africa for the ACHPR has stated, "the absence of a binding international legal regime on internal displacement is a grave lacuna in international law."

In September 2004 the Secretary-General of the UN showed the continuing concern of his office by appointing Walter Kälin as his Representative on the Human Rights of Internally Displaced Persons. Part of his mandate includes the promoting of the Guiding Principles.

== Right of return ==
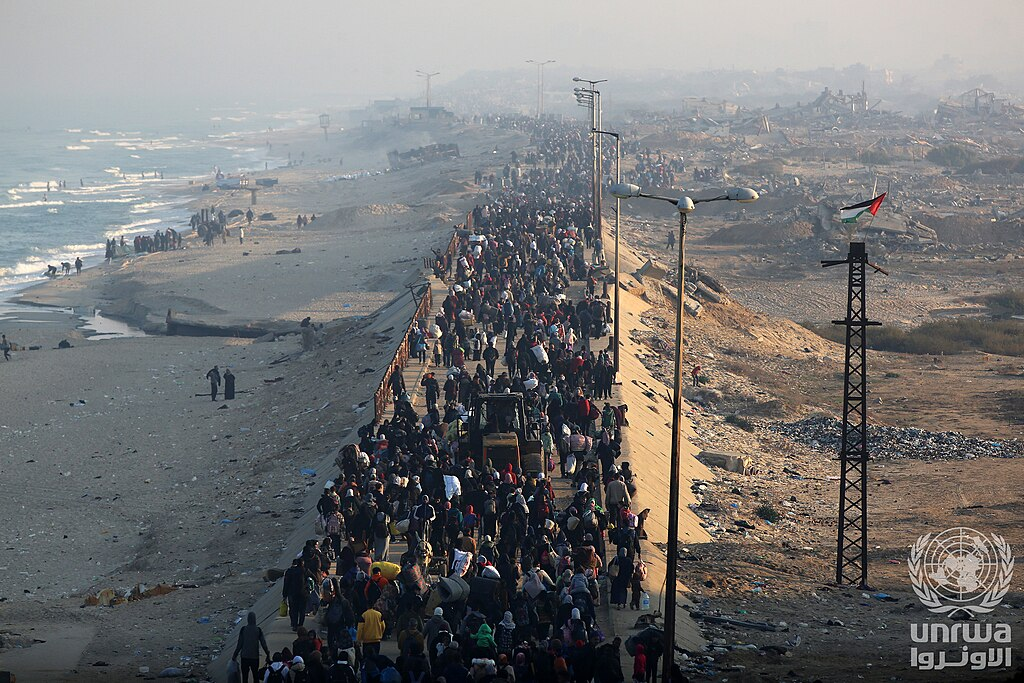
Displaced Palestinians authorized by the Israeli army to return to north of the Gaza Strip enclave during the Gaza War, January 28, 2025

In so-called "post-conflict" situations, there has traditionally been an emphasis in the international community to seek to return to the pre-war status quo. However, opinions are gradually changing, because violent conflict destroys political, economic and social structures and new structures develop as a result, quite often irreversibly. Furthermore, returning to the pre-war status-quo may actually be undesirable if pre-war structures led to the conflict in the first place, or prevented its early resolution. IDPs' and refugees' right of return can represent one of the most complex aspects of this issue.

Normally, pressure is applied by the international community and humanitarian organization to ensure displaced people are able to return to their areas of origin and the same property. The UN Principles for Housing and Property Restitution for Refugees and IDPs, otherwise known as the Pinheiro Principles, provides guidance on the management of the technical and legal aspects of housing, land and property (HLP) restitution. Restitution rights are of key importance to IDPs and refugees around the world, and important to try preventing aggressors benefiting from conflict. However, without a clear understanding of each local context, full restitution rights can be unworkable and fail to protect the people it is designed to protect for the following reasons, refugees and IDPs:

- may never have had property (e.g. in Afghanistan);
- cannot access what property they have (Colombia, Guatemala, South Africa and Sudan);
- ownership is unclear as families have expanded or split and division of the land becomes an issue;
- death of the owner may leave dependents without a clear claim to the land;
- people settled on the land know it is not theirs but have nowhere else to go (as in Colombia, Rwanda and Timor-Leste); and
- have competing claims with others, including the state and its foreign or local business partners (as in Aceh, Angola, Colombia, Liberia and Sudan).

Researchers at ODI Global stress the need for humanitarian organizations to develop greater expertise in these issues, using experts who have knowledge in both humanitarian and land and property issues and so provide better advice to state actors seeking to resolve these issues. The ODI calls on humanitarian agencies to develop an awareness of sustainable reintegration as part of their emphasis on returning IDPs and refugees home. Legal advice needs to be provided to all parties involved even if a framework is created in which to resolve these issues.

== See also ==
- Asylum seekers
- Internal colonialism
- Internally displaced persons in Iraq
- Internal migration
- Internal passport
- Kampala Convention
- Refugees
- Refugee employment
