= List of cities in Somaliland =

Map of Somaliland.

The following are cities and towns in Somaliland, listed alphabetically. Somaliland is currently disputed with Somalia and city statuses may be disputed.

== Cities and towns in Somaliland ==
- Abaarso
- Agabar
- Arabsiyo
- Asha Addo
- Aynabo
- Badhan
- (baderwanag)
- (Bali Ugaadh)
- Baki
- Balanbale
- Balidhiig
- Baligubadle
- Berbera
- Boon
- Bohol
- Borama
- Burao
- (Ali Awad (carabala oodatay)
- Ceerigaabo
- Ceeldhaab
- (dabagoroyale)
- Da'ar buduq
- Dararweyne
- Dhaboolaq
- Dhahar
- Dhummay
- Dilla
- El Afweyne
- Erigavo
- Faraweyne
- Fiqiayuub
- Fiqi Aadan
- Gabiley
- Gowsaweyne
- Gugux
- Habariheshay
- Harirad
- Hargeisa
- Iskudar
- Jidhi
- Las Khorey
- Lawyacado
- Lughaya
- Mandera
- Megagle
- Oodweyne
- Oog
- Qeedi Haan
- Qoryale
- Quljeed
- Salahlay
- Saylac
- Sheikh
- Tog Wajaale
- War Idaad
- Yubbe
- Zeila

== See also ==
- List of cities in Somalia by population
- History of Somaliland
- List of cities in East Africa
