= Sa'ad Musa =

Somali clan

Sacad Muuse سعد موسى

Regions with significant populations

Languages
- Somali, Arabic

Religion
- Islam (Sunni)

Related ethnic groups
- Isamusa, Awal, Habar Yoonis, Ayub, Arap, Eidagale, Habr Je'lo and other Isaaq groups

The Sa'ad Musa or Saad Musa (Somali: Sacad Muuse, Arabic: سعد موسى, Full Name: Saad ibn Musa ibn Zubayr ibn Abd al-Raḥmān ibn ash-Shaykh Isḥāq ibn Aḥmad) is a northern Somali clan. Its members form a part of the Awal , the largest and most populated sub-clan of the Isaaq clan family. The Sa'ad Musa traditionally consists of nomadic pastoralists, coastal people, merchants and farmers.The clan inhabits Hargeisa city Somaliland where they are the majority, including Maroodi Jeex, Awdal and Sahil as well as Djibouti, the Somali Region of Ethiopia, Somalia, Kenya and Tanzania. Historically, the Sa'ad Musa were part of the Adal Sultanate and held the port of Berbera.

== Distribution ==
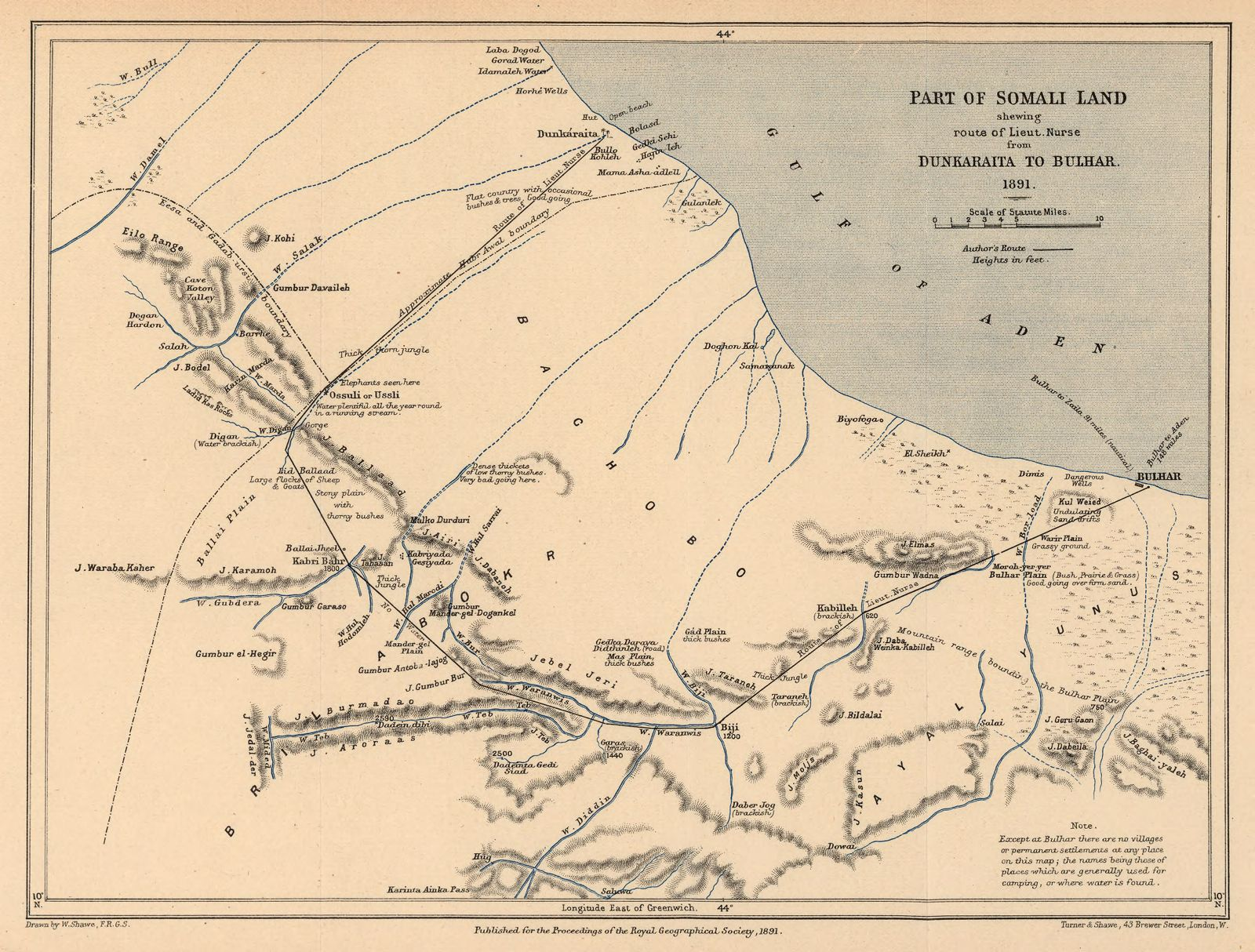
Traditional Territory of select Sacad Muuse Clans in Somaliland

The Sa'ad Musa clan make up a significant percentage of the population in Maroodi Jeex region, which is considered the most populous region in Somaliland, forming a sizeable majority of the population in the national capital Hargeisa as well as exclusively dominating the agricultural towns and City's of Hargeisa, Gabiley, Wajaale, Arabsiyo, Kalabaydh, Agabar, El Bardale, Faraweyne, and Allaybaday.The Sa'ad Musa are also prevalent in western Sahil region in the coastal settlements between Ceel-Sheekh and Bulhar. The Sa'ad Musa also inhabit Northeastern region of Awdal

Outside of Somaliland, the Sa'ad Musa also have large settlements in the Somali Region of Ethiopia, specifically in Fafan Zone where they respectively make up the majority in Harshin, Hart Sheik, Aware, Yocale, Wajaale (Ethi opian Side) towns. They also settle in the Kebri Beyah and Jigjiga woredas in the Fafan Zone.

The Sa'ad Musa also have a large settlement in Kenya where they are known as a constituent segment of the Isahakia community. Finally they have a large presence in Djibouti as well, forming a large percentage of the Somali population in Djibouti and within Djibouti they have historically settled in Quartier 3, which is one of the 7 major districts in Djibouti.

== Lineage ==
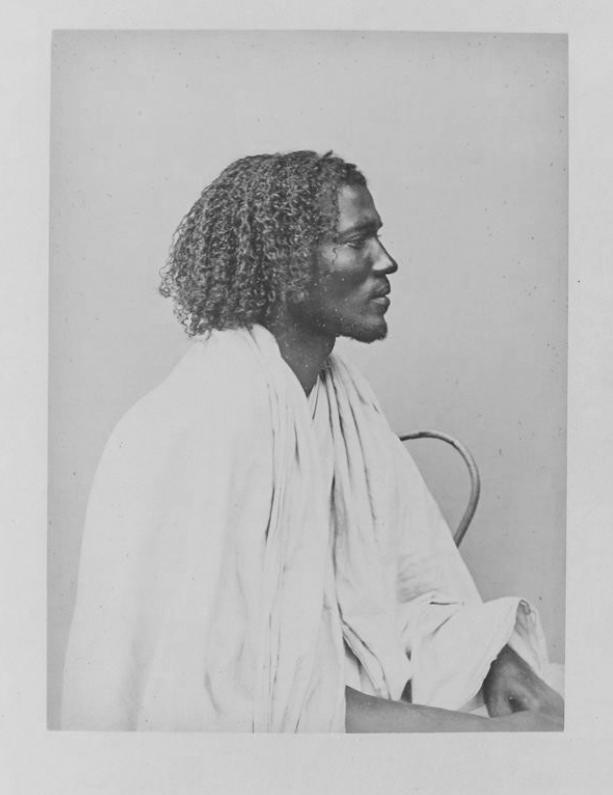
Warsame Yunis of the Reer Geille Abdalla Abukar, Sa'ad Musa. photographed by Roland Bonaparte, 1890

Sheikh Ishaaq ibn Ahmed was one of the Hashemite scholars that crossed the sea from Arabia to the Horn of Africa to spread Islam around 12th to 13th century. Sheikh Isxaaq married two local women in Somaliland that left him eight sons, one of them being Abdulrahman (Awal). The descendants of those eight sons constitute the Isaaq clan-family.

The grave of Zubeyr Awal, the eponymous ancestor of the Sa'ad Musa and Issa Musa of the Habar Awal, is located in Jidali in Sanaag. The town is about 100 km east of the tomb of his grandfather Sheikh Ishaaq Bin Ahmed, the founding father of the Isaaq clan family, whose tomb is located in the coastal town of Maydh.

== History ==
=== Medieval Period (Conquest of Abyssinia) ===
Historically as part of the Habr Awal clan the Sa'ad Musa were part of the Adal Sultanate and are mentioned in the renowned "Futuh al-Habasha" for their major contributions in the Ethiopian-Adal war as the Habr Magaadle along with the Garhajis, Arap and Ayub clans against the Ethiopian Empire, and also for producing a historical figure known as Ahmad Gurey bin Husain who was the righthand partner of Ahmad ibn Ibrahim al-Ghazi and a chieftain for the Habr Magaadle forces during the Ethiopian–Adal war.

=== Pre-colonial era ===
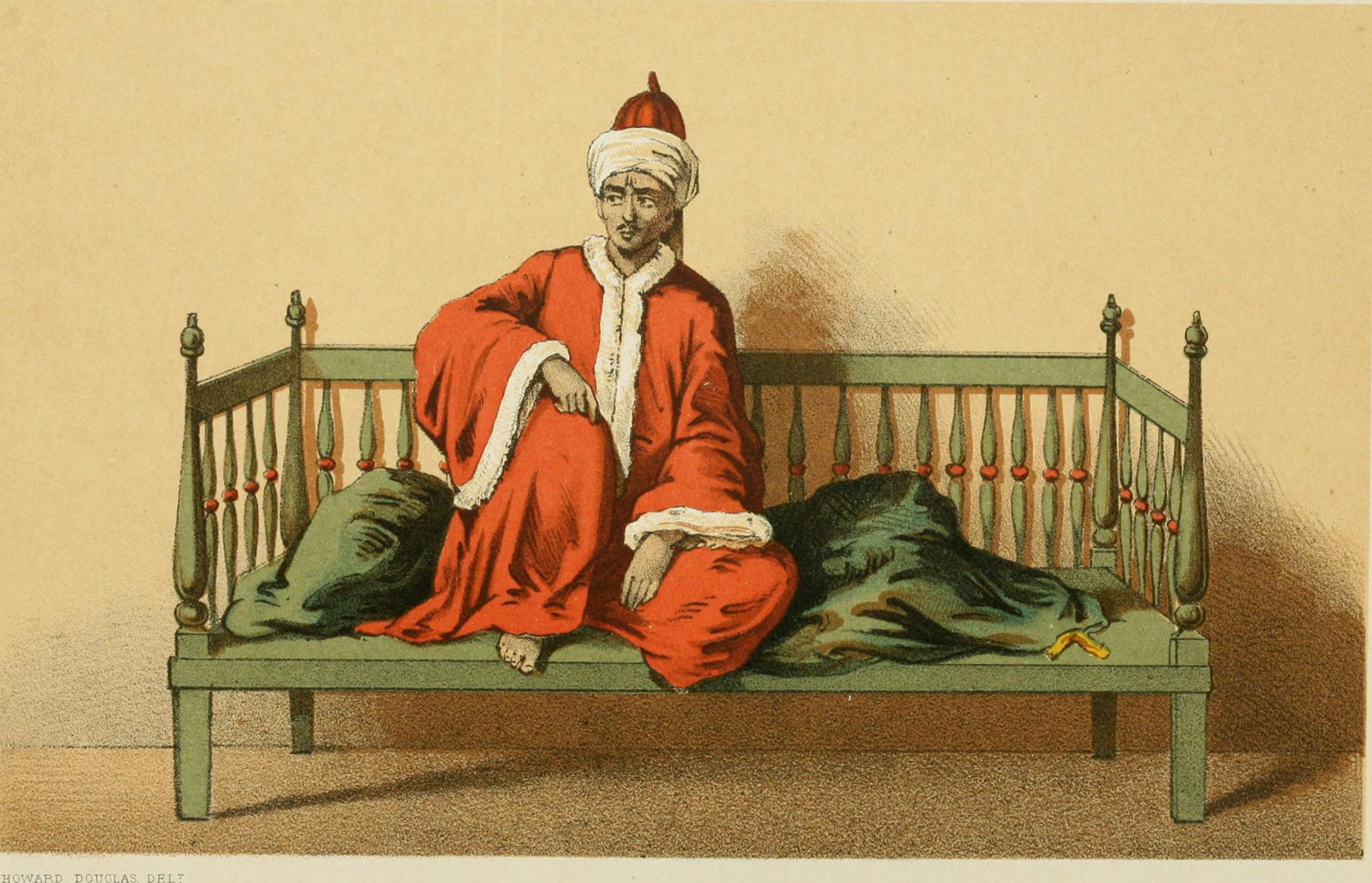
Ahmad Bin Abi Bakr, Emir of Harar and ally of the Habr Awal

The Sa'ad Musa have a rich mercantile history largely due to their possession of the major Somali port of Berbera, which was the chief port and settlement of the wider Habr Awal clan during the early modern period.

The Habr Awal clan maintained close ties with the Emirate of Harar, where its members were influential in political, economic, and religious affairs. Harari Emirs held Habr Awal merchants in high esteem, relying on their trade networks linking Harar to Red Sea ports and the wider Indian Ocean world. In the mid-19th century, Richard Francis Burton noted their prominence in the court of Emir Ahmad III ibn Abu Bakr. The Habr awal members also held senior offices such as Malaq and Wazir who was second in command of Harar, the latter being the second-highest position in the Emirate. The Habr Awal also exerted religious influence: during Burton’s visit, two leading Islamic scholars were from the clan of Kabir Khalil and Kabir Yonis, continuing an earlier legacy represented by Aw Muhammad, the Imam of Annajina, who helped spread Islam among the Oromo of Bali.

The Sa'ad Musa as a whole are a rich people, mainly thanks to the trade passing through the port of Berbera which lies in the territory of the Sa’ad Musa.

In this way the tribes occupying the tract of country through which the main caravan or trade routes passed accumulated a good deal of wealth, while those like the Ayal Ahmed, fortunate enough to possess a port so favored by Nature as Berbera, naturally soon became rich.

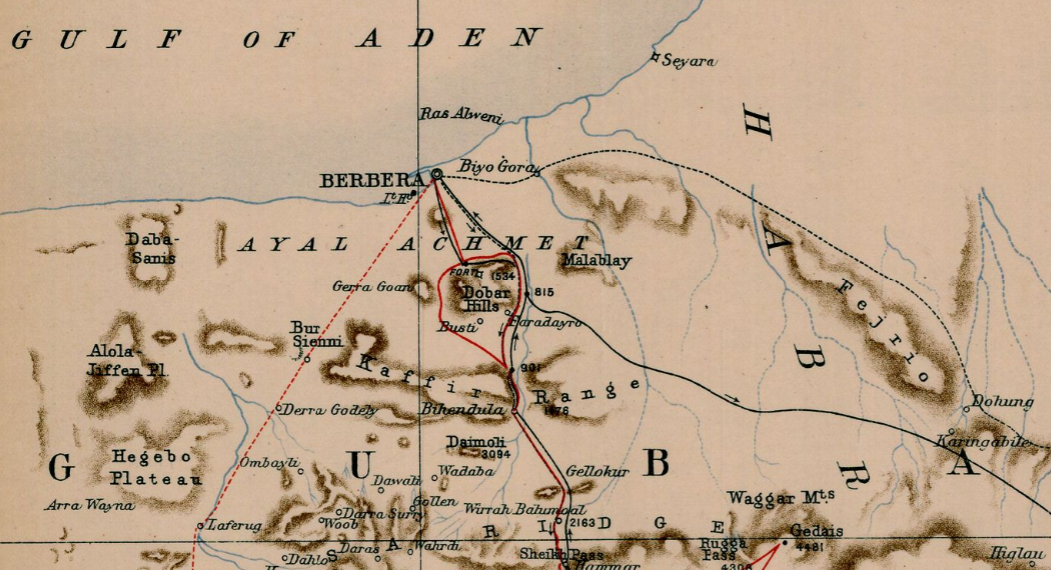
Trade routes leading into Berbera with the 'Ayal Achmet' (Reer Ahmed Nuh) located in & around Berbera and the easterly fort of Siyara visible

The Habr Awal merchants had extensive trade relations with Arab and Indian merchants from Arabia and the Indian subcontinent respectively. When these foreign traders arrived in Berbera and Bulhar to conduct trade, there was a mutually beneficial arrangement based on the abban (protection) system between them and the local Reer Yunis Nuh (Ayyal Yunis) and Ahmed Nuh (Ayyal Ahmed) lineages of the Sa’ad Musa:

Before this, and prior to the British settlement at Aden in 1839, the Ayyal Yunis and Ayyal Ahmed lineages of the Habr Awal clan had held Berbera and jointly managed its trade, sharing in the profits on all commercial transactions as ‘protectors’ (abans) of foreign merchants from Arabia and India. When under the stimulus of developments at Aden the port's prosperity markedly increased, the numerically dominant Ayyal Yunis drove out their rival kinsmen and declared themselves commercial masters of Berbera. This led to a feud in which each side sought outside help; the defeated Ayyal Ahmed turned to Haji Shirmarke ‘Ali and his Habr Yunis clansmen for support. With this backing, they were then able to re-establish themselves and to expel the Ayyal Yunis who moved to the small roadstead of Bulhar, some miles to the west of Berbera.

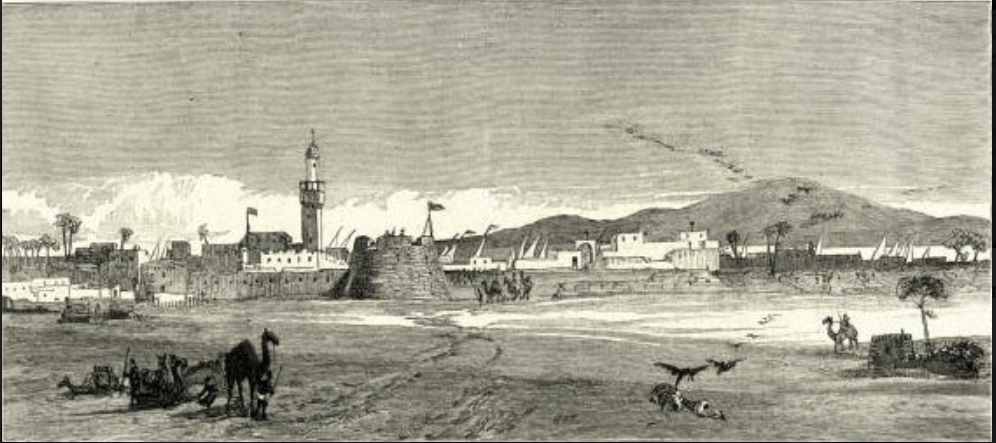
Illustration of Berbera, 1884

Not only did the Sa'ad Musa host foreign merchants at their ports, they also conducted trade missions on their own vessels to the Arabian ports. The majority of the Somali merchants who frequented Aden and other Southern Arabian ports hailed from the Sa'ad Musa clan. They procured various raw goods from Harar and the interior in exchange for manufactured goods. During their stay, the Sa'ad Musa rented their own houses and hired their own servants, whereas other Somali clans tended to stay with relatives already established across the Gulf.

Merchants. — These are generally members of the Sa'ad Musa tribe. They bring from Harrar and the Galla country, coffee, saffron (bastard), tusks (ivory), and feathers, taking away in return zinc, brass, broad cloth, and piece goods. They remain in Aden for about twenty days at a time during the trading season, which lasts about nine months,' making four trips. During their residence they hire a house, and are accompanied by their own domestics.

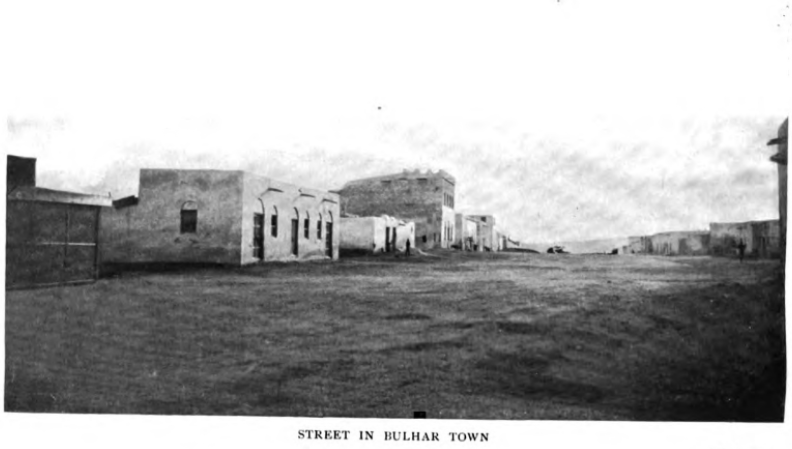
Street in Bulhar

In the interior, Sa'ad Musa trade caravans (khafilas) were a frequent sight according to contemporary European accounts of the Somali Peninsula:

On leaving Hargeisa we travelled for many miles through beautiful park-like land, alive with birds and jungle fowl. We met the usual Somali khafilas [trading caravans] of Habr-Awal men, carrying their skins, gums, ghee, and coffee to our port at Bulhar, situated between Berbera and Zeila.

The Somalis from the deep interior, principally those from the Ogaden, also gained most of their resources from the Sa'ad Musa merchants who they called "iidoor", an enviable pejorative meaning merchant or trader, a reference to the mercantile nature of the Sa'ad Musa traders at the time. The coastal Sa'ad Musa (mainly of the Reer Ahmed Nuh sub-division) regularly acted as brokers/middlemen for the Somali clans of the interior who wished to take their goods to the ports of Berbera and Bulhar:

The custom is for the Ayal Achmet (Berbera tribe) to act as brokers, and too often most of the profits stick to the hands of the middleman. Till lately no Ogadayn ever went to the coast, but entrusted the goods to coast traders.

==== Battle of Berbera ====
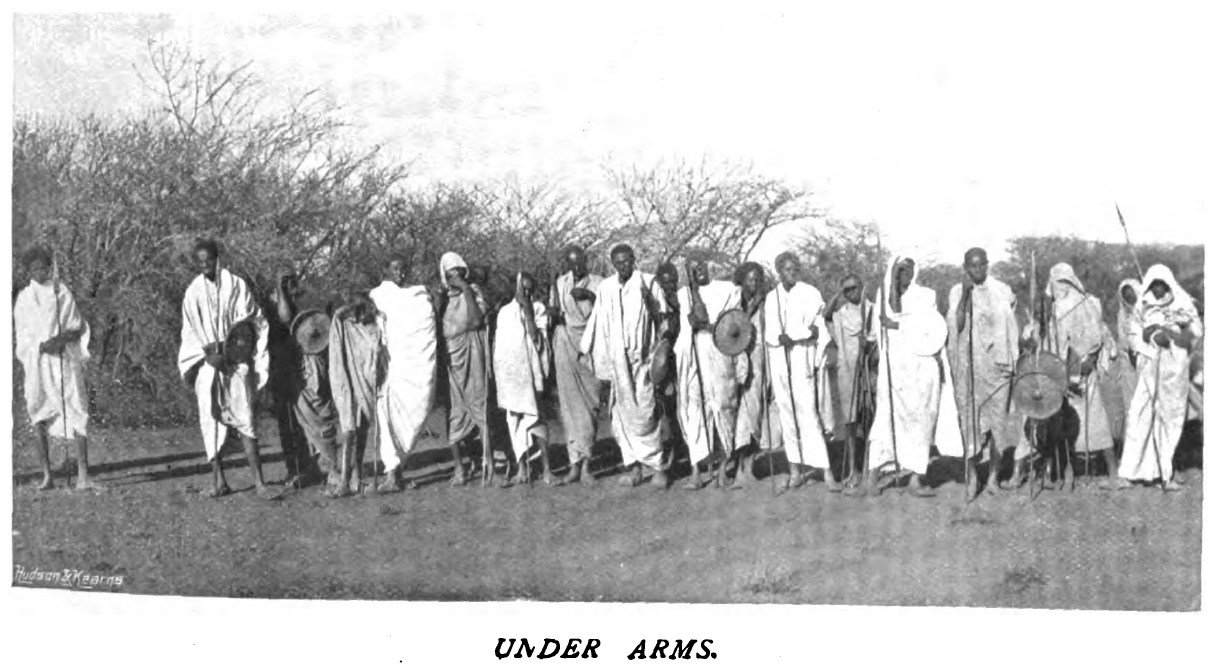
Sa'ad Musa warriors preparing for battle near Hargeisa

When a British vessel named the Mary Anne attempted to dock in Berbera's port in 1825 it was attacked and multiple members of the crew were massacred by the Habr Awal, including the Sa'ad Musa. In response the Royal Navy enforced a blockade and some accounts narrate a bombardment of the city. In 1827 two years later the British arrived and extended an offer to relieve the blockade which had halted Berbera's lucrative trade in exchange for indemnity. Following this initial suggestion the Battle of Berbera 1827 would break out. After the Habr Awal defeat, 15,000 Spanish dollars was to be paid by the Habr Awal leaders for the destruction of the ship and loss of life.

The Isaaq Sultan Farah Guled and Haji Ali penned a letter to Sultan bin Saqr Al Qasimi of Ras Al Khaimah requesting military assistance and joint religious war against the British.

This would not materialize as Sultan Saqr was incapacitated by prior Persian Gulf campaign of 1819 and was unable to send aid to Berbera. Alongside their stronghold in the Persian Gulf & Gulf of Oman the Qasimi were very active both militarily and economically in the Gulf of Aden and were given to plunder and attack ships as far west as the Mocha on the Red Sea. They had numerous commercial ties with the Somalis, leading vessels from Ras Al Khaimah and the Persian Gulf to regularly attend trade fairs in the large ports of Berbera and Zeila and were very familiar with the Saad Muuse.

=== Garaads and Sultans of the Sacad Muuse ===
The Sa'ad Musa have a long tradition of leadership and are led by a Sultan from the Ahmed Abdalla branch - a numerous subclan of Saad Musa that mainly reside in Ethiopia. The Sa'ad Mus are the traditional holders of the Habr Awal Sultanate since the 18th century. Historically preferring to use the native term Garad like the Warsangeli, both clans have since changed the name of the title to Suldaan although the role is identical. Habr Awal Garaads would rally men in times of war and settle large disputes with other clans filling the role as the ultimate peacemaker (nabadoon). The first Garaad Biniin was crowned around a similar time as the first Habr Yunis Sultan Diriiye Ainasha, with both of these large subclans breaking from the tutelage of the Eidagale who were the wider leaders of the Isaaq Sultanate. Following his death, the Habr Awal did not crown a new Garaad for several years as Biniin's heirs were too young, with Garaad Abdalla being crowned to succeed his father when he came of age. Fighting in the southern limits of Habr Awal territory to protect the clan against its enemies and fighting off raids. In one incident he narrowly avoided a Jidwaaq surprise attack with the Ahmed Abdalla rallying quickly and forcing the raiders to flee.

	Name	Reign From	Reign Till
1	Garaad Biniin (first Garaad)		
2	Garaad Abdalla Garaad Biniin		
3	Garaad Askar Garaad Abdalla		
4	Garaad Diriiye Garaad Abdalla		
5	Sultan Abdulrahman Garaad Diriiye (adopted Sultan title)		
6	Sultan Abdillahi Sultan Abdulrahman		
7	Sultan Abdirizaq Sultan Abdillahi		
8	Sultan Hassan Sultan Abdillahi		

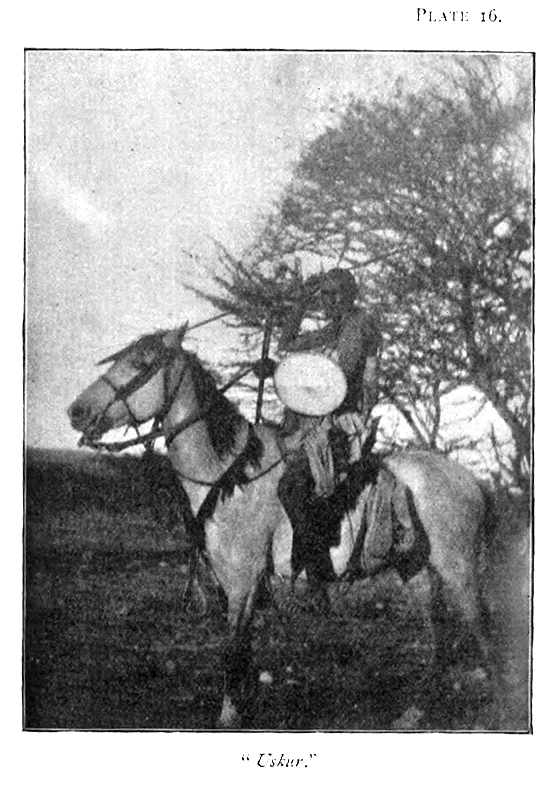
Future Garaad Askar photographed in 1895

Garaad Abdalla served for several decades and was received by travelling British officials near the southern limit of the protectorate in 1894 concerning expansion by General Ras Makonen on behalf of Menelik II. Garaad Abdalla alongside many other leaders in British Somaliland such as Sultan Deria Hassan and Sheikh Madar were worried about a devastating raid by the Abyssinian forces aimed at the burgeoning town Hargeisa and its environs. The Garaad was contacted by Makonen just two years later asking him and the Habr Awal to join the Ethiopian Empire but was rebuffed. Garaad Abdalla was approached by the Sultan of Habr Yunis when they had faced a drought, the Habr Yunis requested access to Habr Awal wells to water. Abdalla granted the request but some members of his clan thought he was too generous and helping the Habr Yunis at the expense of the wellbeing of their own stock. Chief amongst these people was his 15 year old Askar. When some of the Habr Yunis party came to water, Askar stepped in between the well and the men barring them access. He was reprimanded for his foolishness and told to step aside and obey his father's wishes. Enraged Askar stabbed the man who reprimanded him and war almost broke out at this action.

A wise Habr Awal bard from Bulhar named Aami stood and recited a gabay

The words too many have already been spoken about Yunis' foolish words
But righteous judgement pious to you according to ancient custom, bringing peace and (firmly) like a mountain
Very close to you lurk people, you enemies, from primeval times their commemorating a feud
If the time came when you were blinded by the quarrel, you would not respect it
Without hesitation, they suddenly fell upon you
All hostile tribes have heard the news of your quarrel
Like vultures, they all look greedily at your flesh!

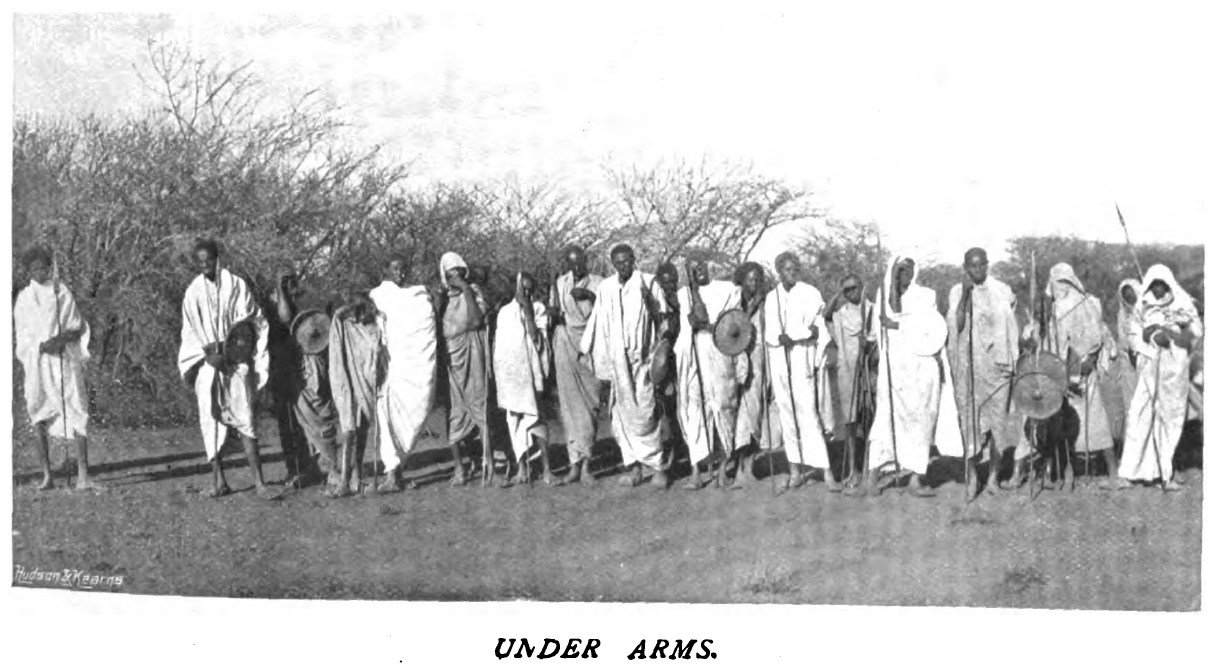
Warriors of the Sacad Muuse clan

The parties were moved by his words and mediated their dispute. Garaad Abdalla gave the hand of one of his daughters to the poet as a reward for his efforts. Following Abdalla's death, his eldest son Askar succeeded him as Garaad. Askar was a skilled horseman and fought in offensive with the southern sections of the clan against the Dervish who had begun raiding Habr Awal and other clans in the region. Sheikh Madar rallied the northern sections of the Habr Awal who unlike the Ahmed Abdalla and a few others, did reside mainly inside the borders of British Somaliland. Following Askar's death his younger brother Deria took the mantle of Garaad and unlike his brother and father was more focused on the concerns of the Habr Awal community as a period of relative peace had set in following the defeat of the Dervishes, decreasing the need for fighting. Diriiye was faced with a parallel challenger to his role as Garaad and the Habr Awal rallied behind him and rebuffed the pretender.

With Deria's eventual death, his son Abdulrahman was crowned and the first Habr Awal leader to style himself as 'Sultan' rather than Garaad. Abdulrahman was very much like his father however was much more active in protectorate affairs.

In the year 1955, Sultan Abdulrahman Deria was a member of a four delegation team of politicians and Sultans to London, United Kingdom. Their goal was to petition and pressure the British Government in returning lost treaty territory known as the 'Haud Reserve Area' ceded to Ethiopian Empire during the Anglo Ethiopian treaty of 1954.

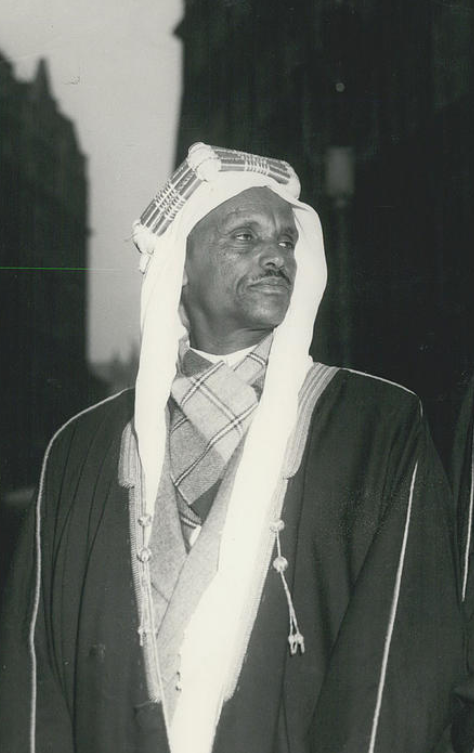
Sultan Abdulrahman Deria (left) in London, 1955

In Imperial Policies and Nationalism in The Decolonization of Somaliland, 1954-1960, Historian Jama Mohamed writes:

The N.U.F. campaigned for the return of the territories both in Somaliland and abroad. In March 1955, for instance, a delegation consisting of Michael Mariano, Abokor Haji Farah and Abdi Dahir went to Mogadisho to win the support and co-operation of the nationalist groups in Somalia. And in February and May 1955 another delegation consisting of two traditional Sultans (Sultan Abdillahi Sultan Deria, and Sultan Abdulrahman Sultan Deria), and two Western-educated moderate politicians (Michael Mariano, Abdirahman Ali Mohamed Dubeh) visited London and New York. During their tour of London, they formally met and discussed the issue with the Secretary of State for the Colonies, Alan Lennox-Boyd. They told Lennox-Boyd about the 1885 Anglo-Somali treaties. Under the agreements, Michael Mariano stated, the British Government 'undertook never to cede, sell, mortgage or otherwise give for occupation, save to the British Government, any portion of the territory inhabited by them or being under their control'. But now the Somali people 'have heard that their land was being given to Ethiopia under an Anglo-Ethiopian Treaty of 1897'. That treaty, however, was 'in conflict' with the Anglo-Somali treaties 'which took precedence in time' over the 1897 Anglo-Ethiopian Treaty[.] The British Government had 'exceeded its powers when it concluded the 1897 Treaty and ... the 1897 Treaty was not binding on the tribes.' Sultan Abdillahi also added that the 1954 agreement was a 'great shock to the Somali people' since they had not been told about the negotiations, and since the British Government had been administering the area since 1941. The delegates requested, as Sultan Abdulrahman put it, the postponement of the implementation of the agreement to 'grant the delegation time to put up their case' in Parliament and in international organizations.

== Clans ==
In the Isaaq clan-family, component clans are divided into two uterine divisions, as shown in the genealogy. The first division is between those lineages descended from sons of Sheikh Ishaaq by a Harari woman – the Habr Habuusheed – and those descended from sons of Sheikh Ishaaq by a Somali woman of the Magaadle sub-clan of the Dir – the Habr Magaadle.

== Notable figures ==
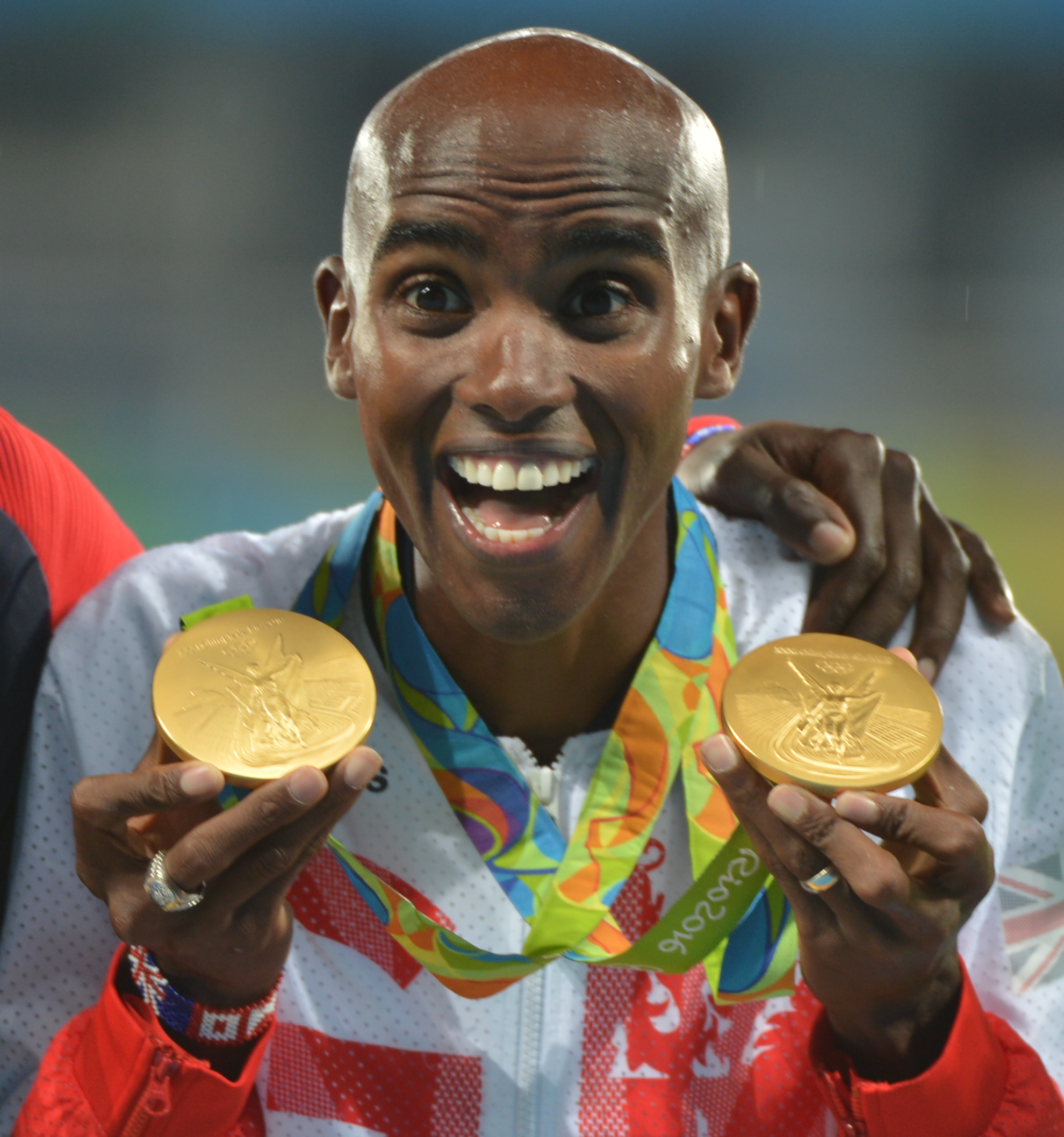
Mo Farah, British four-time Olympic gold medalist and the most decorated athlete in British athletics history.

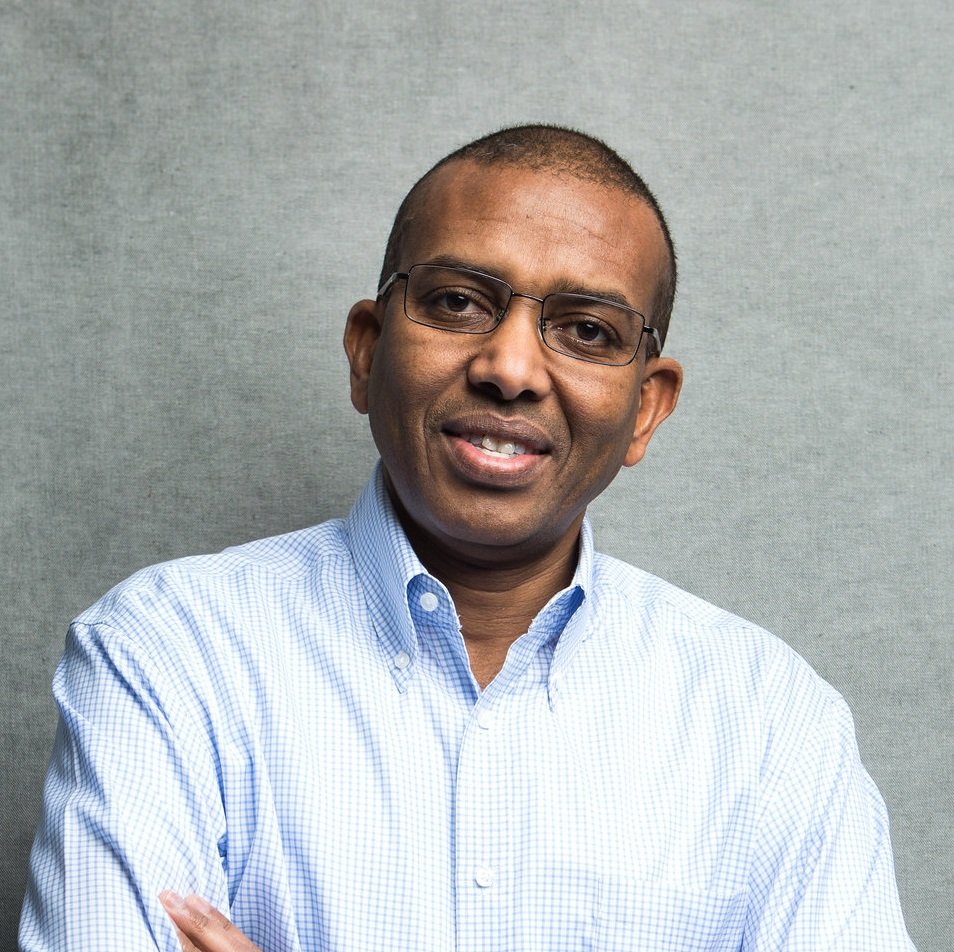
Ismail Ahmed, owner and CEO of WorldRemit which is one of the largest money transfer companies in the world. Considered the 7th most influential man in the United Kingdom.

The Sacad Muuse have produced many of the most prominent Somali politicians, poets, and businessmen in history.

- Abdillahi Suldaan Mohammed Timacade, known as "Timacade", a famous poet during the pre- and post-colonial periods
- Abdurrahman Mahmoud Aidiid, former Mayor of Hargeisa, the capital of the Republic of Somaliland.
- Abdul Majid Hussein, Economist, Former Permanent Representative of Ethiopia to the United Nations, 2001-2004. Leader of Ethiopian Somali Democratic League (ESDL) party in the Somali Region of Ethiopia from 1995 to 2001.
- Sultan Abdulrahman Garad Deria, 1st Sultan & 5th leader of the Habr Awal
- Sheikh Madar Ahmed Shirwac, credited with the early growth of Hargeisa
- Sheikh Ibrahim Sheikh Yusuf Sheikh Madar, served as the elected chairman of the SNM in January 1982 [1] and later served as the Guurti leader in the Somaliland Parliament.[2] He was a grandson of the famous Sheikh Madar.
- Ahmed Mohamed Gulaid, was one of the founding members of the Somali National Movement and was the first to be elected as the chairman of the organization in October 1981.
- Muuse Inji, former Minister of Agriculture and the former Minister of Information.
- Ahmed Hassan Awke, Legendary Somali journalist and broadcaster. He was a veteran of the BBC World Service, the Voice of America, Somaliland National TV, Horn Cable Television, Radio Mogadishu and Universal TV among also being the presidential spokesman of Siad Barre during his Military Junta.
- Ali Abdi Farah, Former Minister of Communication and Culture in Djibouti
- Ali Feiruz, celebrated Somali musician in Djibouti and Somaliland
- Gaarriye (born Mohamed Hashi Dhama), Famous poet who composed one of the best known Somali language poems on the theme of reconciliation, "Hagarlaawe" (The Charitable).
- Ibrahim Dheere, Considered to be the first Somali billionaire and richest Somali person in the world with an estimated net worth of 1.8 billion US Dollars.
- Ismail Ahmed, owner and CEO of WorldRemit which is one of the fastest growing money transfer company in the world and he's considered 7th most influential man in Britain.
- Mohammed Abdillahi Kahin 'Ogsadey', A Somali business tycoon based in Ethiopia, where he established MAO Harar Horse, the first African corporation to export coffee and amassed a net worth of approximately $3 Billion Ethiopian Birr.
- Mohamed Abdullahi Omaar, former Foreign Minister of Somalia
- Mohamed Hasan Abdullahi, former Chief of Staff of Somaliland Armed Forces
- Mo Farah, British four-time Olympic gold medalist and the most decorated athlete in British athletics history. He's also considered to be the best marathon runner in the world.
- Mohamed Omar Arte, former Deputy Prime Minister of Somalia.
- Muhammad Hawadle Madar, former Prime Minister of Somalia from September 3, 1990 to January 24, 1991.
- Muse Bihi Abdi, Current President Of Somaliland since December 2017, and former military officer served as a Somali Air Force Colonel.
- Nuh Ismail Tani, current Chief of Staff of Somaliland Armed Forces
- Umar Arteh Ghalib, former Prime Minister of Somalia, 1991–1993; brought Somalia into the Arab League in 1974 during his term as Foreign Minister of Somalia, 1969-1977; former president of UN Security Council; teacher and poet
- Khadar Ahmed Omar, current Deputy Mayor of Hargeisa
