= Tog Wajaale =

City on the border of Somalia and Ethiopia

Wajaale Wajaale (Somali) وجالَه (Arabic)
- City
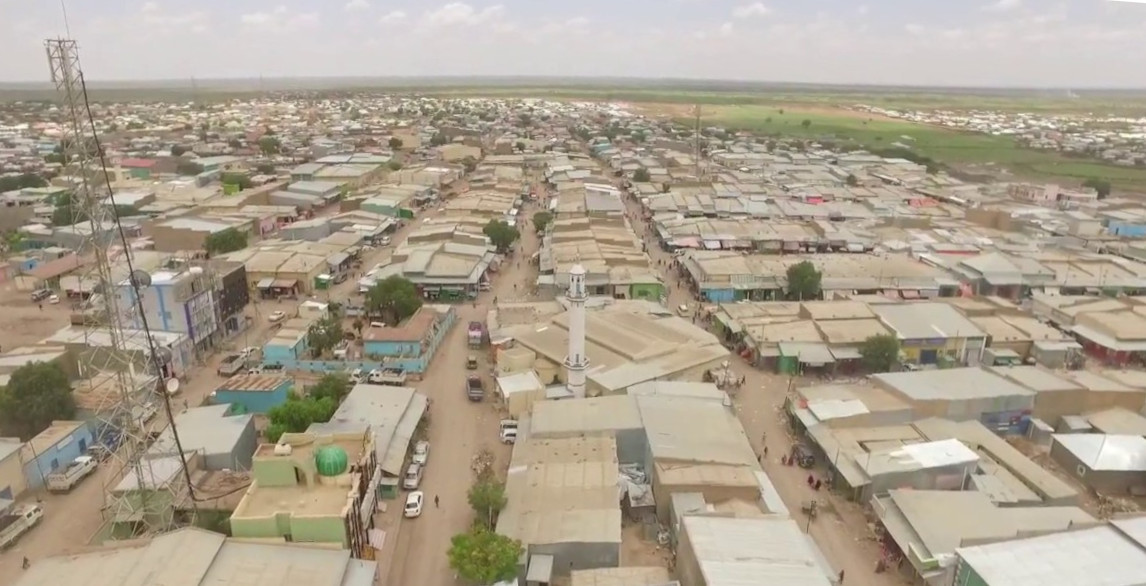

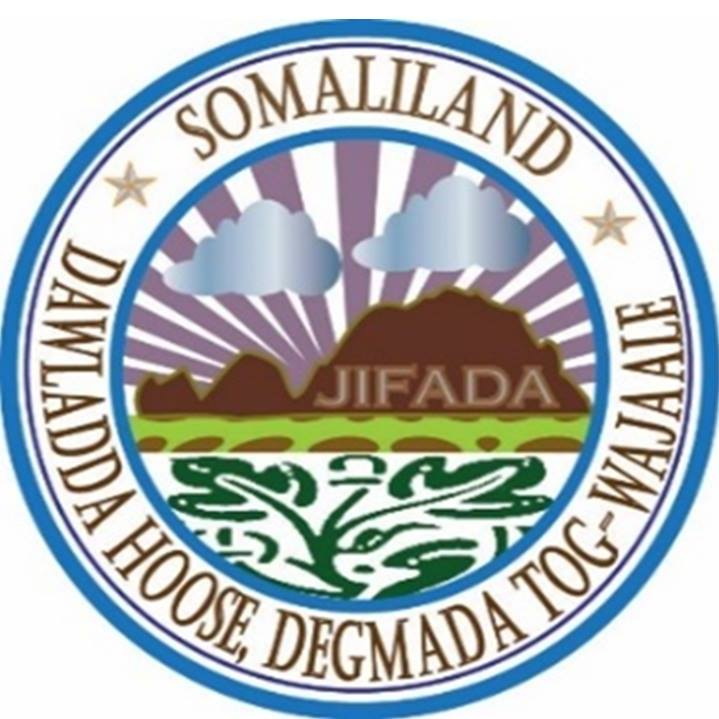
- Seal

- Location in Somaliland Wajaale (Somaliland) Wajaale (Ethiopia)
- Coordinates: 9°36′05″N 43°20′10″E
- Country: Somaliland
- Region: Maroodi Jeex
- District: Gabiley District

Population
  - Total: 70,450
  - Rank: 8th
- Time zone: UTC+3 (EAT)

Tog Wajaale (also known as Wajaale, Wajale, Tug Wajale, Togwajaale) is a city on the border of Somaliland and Ethiopia. Tog Wajaale is the main border crossing for goods coming in and out of Somaliland, primarily from the port city of Berbera, Somaliland's main port.

The settlements on the Ethiopian side of the border are called Togo Wuchale, Togo Chale, Wajaale, etc., and are located about 20 km southwest of Tog Wajaale in Somaliland.

== Demographics ==
Wajaale's population was estimated at 10,000 in 1995 and 40,000 in 2012. The city is exclusively inhabited by people from the Somali ethnic group, Sa'ad Muuse Isaaq, this clan dominating both the town itself and the wider Wajaale district.

The report for 2022 estimates 70,450 people.

According to the 2007 census conducted by the Central Statistical Agency of Ethiopia (CSA) the Ethiopian part of the town (Togo Wuchale) had a population of 14,438.

== Geography ==
Wajale is located the border of Somaliland and Ethiopia. 92.8 km west of Hargeisa, the capital of Somaliland. It is in the south west of Kalabaydh town, on the west by the Awdal region, on the east by the Gabiley, Hargeisa City, and on the south by the Somali Region of Ethiopia.

Geographical coordinates are 9° 34' 0" North, 43° 29' 0" East

== Education ==
Primary schools, Secondary schools and University education is available throughout the district.[5]

Primary schools

- Number of Primary Schools – 17

Secondary schools

- Number of Secondary Schools – 2

== Customs and immigration ==
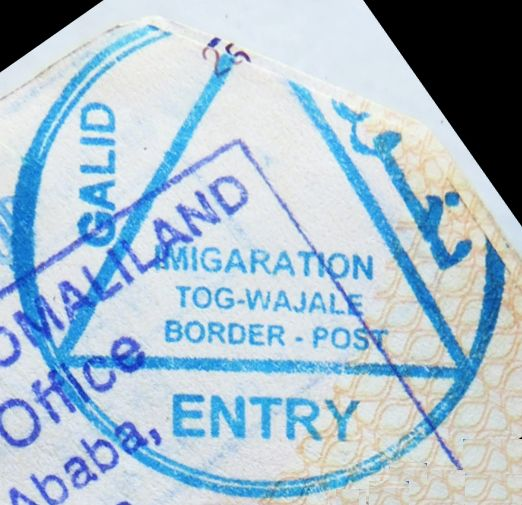
Somaliland entry stamp in Wajaale

Since December 1985, refugees from Ethiopia have been taking refuge in Wajaale camps, reaching 45,000 as of April 1986. Seventy percent of the refugees were Oromo.

In 2002, the World Health Organization listed 11 border towns in Somaliland, including Wajaale. Wajaale and Lawyacado are home to customs and immigration offices.

In June 2009, the Ethiopian government closed the border at Wajaale.

In January 2012, Human Rights Watch criticized the Somaliland government for deporting political refugees from Ethiopia.

In November 2012, the Immigration Headquarters was opened in Hargeisa to manage the four entry points into Somaliland: Hargeisa, Wajaale, Borama, and Berbera.

In December 2012, an increase in illegal immigration to Ethiopia and other countries due to lack of jobs in Somaliland led to 200 young people being deported to Somaliland via Wajaale in the first 11 months of 2012.

In December 2015, the Somaliland government arrested 200 illegal immigrants from Ethiopia in Wajaale.

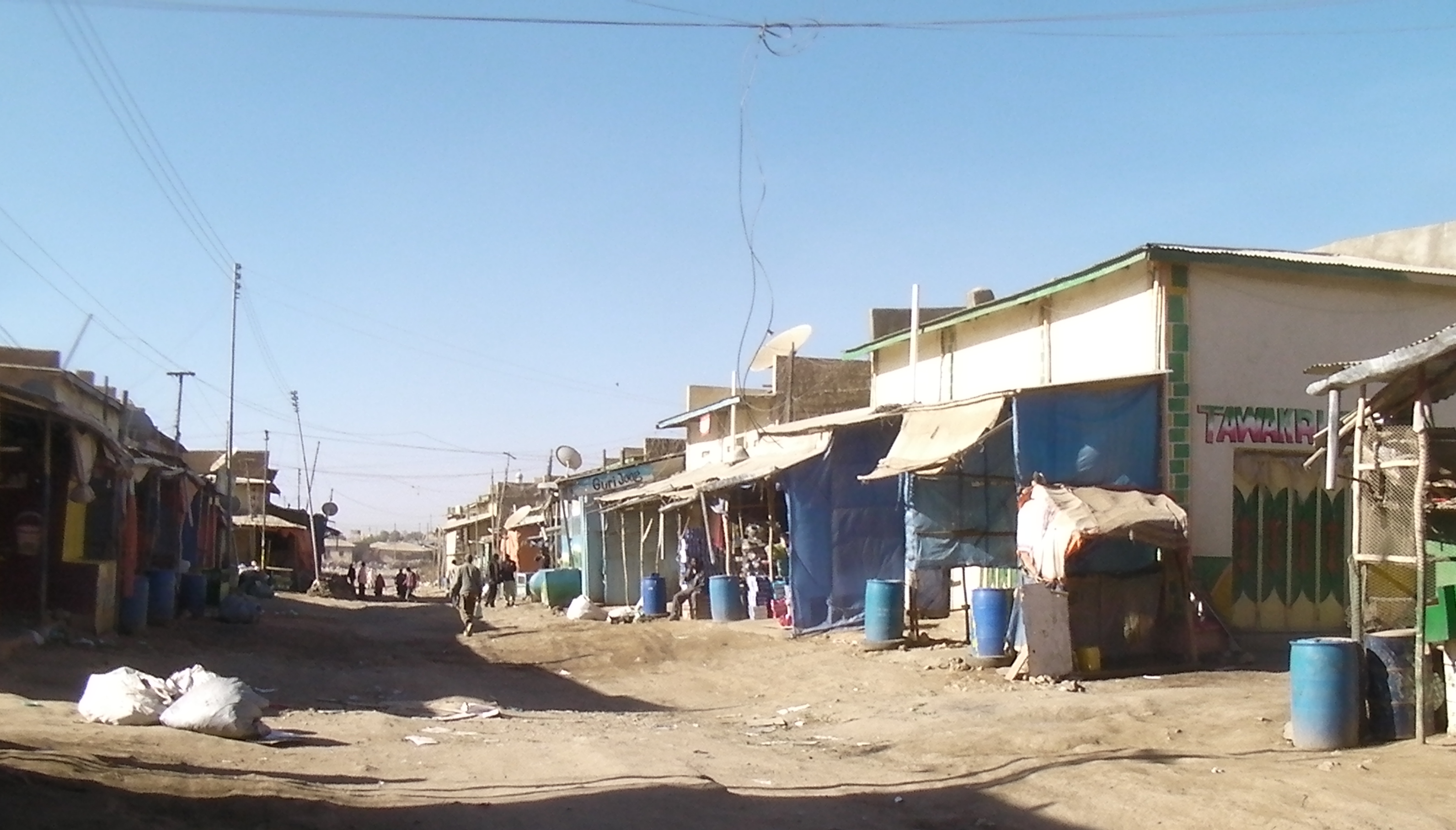
Somaliland side

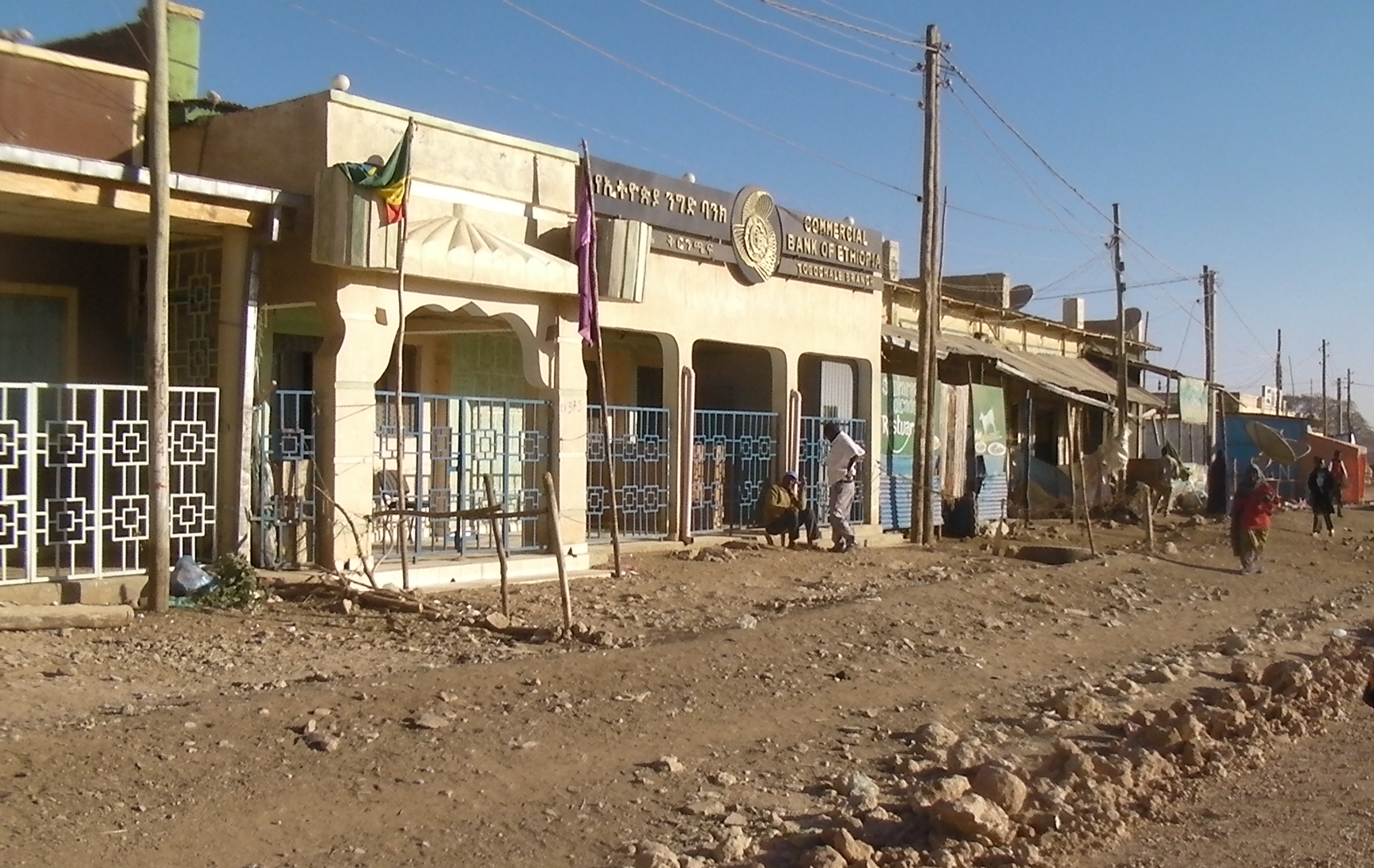
Ethiopia side

== Transportation and logistics ==
The road from Berbera to Ethiopia via Wajaale is called the Berbera corridor and is an important trade route for Ethiopia.

In August 2011, it was announced that the Chinese oil company PetroTrans was planning to expand the port of Berbera to include a road to Wajaale for exports to Ethiopia.

In December 2020, the Somaliland government's authorization of an Ethiopian logistics provider to transport vegetables directly to Hargeisa was denounced by Wajaale logistics, which has no logistics authority in Ethiopia, as a decision that would lead to unfair competition.

As of November 2022, the road connecting Wajaale and Kalabaydh is under repair.

== Notable people ==
- Ahmed Hassan Awke (1948 - 16 November 2015) - veteran Somali journalist

== Recent history ==
=== Before Somali Civil War ===
Wajaale was founded by Sheikh Ahmed Noor Odoowa around 1944. And then Beginning in the early 1960s, a conflict between the Reer yoonis of Isaaq and the Reer Nuur of Gadabursi occurred in magaala cad and garbahaadley which near wajaale, which affected Wajaale. This conflict lasted for a long time in the areas inhabited by both clans, but reconciliation took place in Wajaale.

In the 1964 Ethiopian-Somali War, fighting between Ethiopian and Somali forces occurred in Wajaale, largely destroying the town.

In January 1987, 10 international employees of Médecins Sans Frontières were kidnapped in Wajaale; they were released two weeks later.

=== After the Declaration of Independence of Somaliland ===
In February 1997, UNICEF led discussions among the communities of Gabiley, Arabsiyo, and Wajaale on local health issues.

When taxes on Somalis were raised in Ogaden, Ethiopia, the number of people migrating to the Somaliland border town of Wajaale surged, doubling its population. This led to a shortage of ballots for the 2002 Somaliland regional elections.

In March 2008, the President of Somaliland announced the creation of six new regions and 14 new districts, with Wajaale becoming the Wajaale District of Gabiley region. However, this classification was not approved by Parliament and did not take root.

In February 2009, a Kenyan convert from Islam was detained and assaulted by Wajaale border officials in Somaliland while attempting to enter Somaliland from Ethiopia.

In April 2009, Wajaale was also affected by flooding in western Somaliland.

In 2010, it was reported that HIV was prevalent along the Ethiopian to Somaliland roadway, centered in Wajaale.

In June 2011, Ethiopian security forces arrested a Somaliland intelligence officer in Jijiga. This was seen as retaliation for the arrest of an Ethiopian plainclothes officer by Somaliland police in Wajaale. Security departments from both countries gathered in Wajaale for discussions to resolve this.

In March 2012, it was reported that a well failed in Wajaale, resulting in a water shortage and the purchase of expensive water from Ethiopia. The population at this point is estimated at 40,000 and the water project in Wajaale will reportedly not be completed until 2015.

In November 2013, the first lady of Somaliland opened an orphanage in Wajaale.

In May 2014, police officers killed civilians protesting in Wajaale.

In November 2014, a fire destroyed 20 homes in Wajaale. Residents protested that the government's response was inadequate.

In November 2014, an earthquake occurred in Wajaale.

In December 2017, a large fire broke out in Wajaale, destroying more than 90 stores.

In August 2018, the Oromia-Somali clashes in Ethiopia destabilized the Somali region but kept calm in Wajaale, a Somaliland territory.

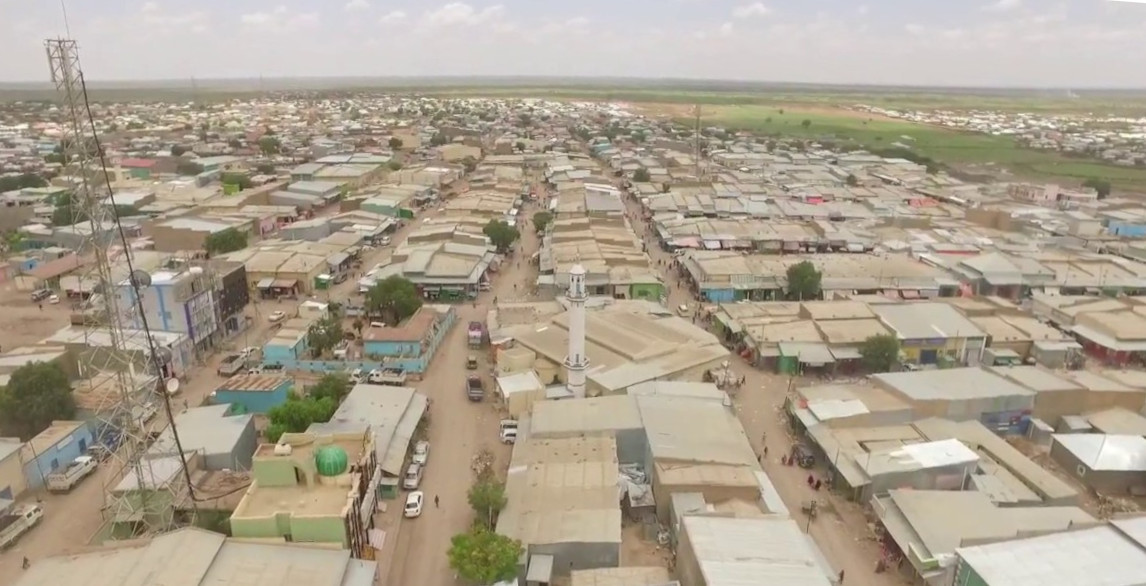
Wajaale in 2020

In September 2020, a building under construction collapsed in Wajaale, killing four people.

In April 2021, the Somaliland Minister of Finance visited Wajaale. Around 2021, a new market was built in an area of 1,800 meters square, replacing the old one.
