= Gabiley National Library =

Public library in Somaliland

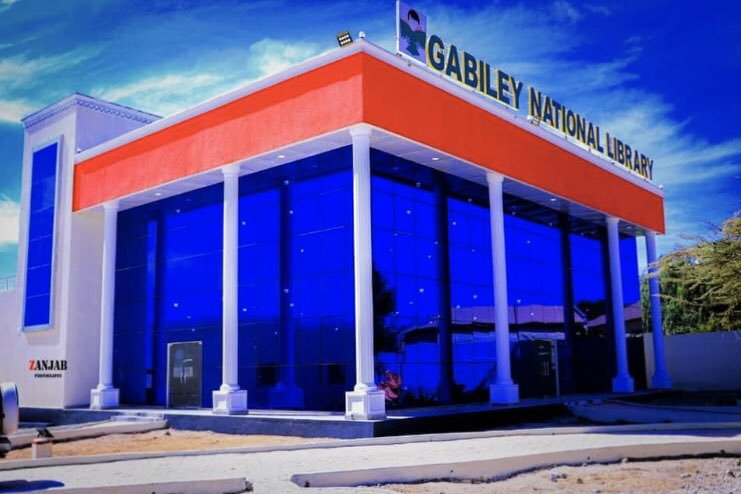
- 9°42′05″N 43°37′33″E
- Location: Gabiley, Maroodi Jeex, Somaliland
- Type: Public library
- Established: April 2021
- Service area: Accessible to the public
- Branch of: National Library of Somaliland

Other information
- Director: Mustafe M. Hassan

The Gabiley National Library and Community Center is the main public library in Gabiley, in the Maroodi Jeex region of Somaliland. It was founded in 2019, and opened in April 2021. In addition to its collection of books, periodicals, and digital resources, the library has spaces where it hosts workshops and lectures.

== History ==
The Gabiley National Library was created as part of efforts to improve access to education and learning resources in the region. Before its establishment, residents had limited access to organized library services and dedicated study environments. The creation of the library aimed to address this gap by offering a central location for reading, research, and educational support. The project was developed in 2019 and officially opened to the public in April 2021. Since its opening, the library has gradually expanded its services and programs to meet the needs of the local population. It has become a recognized institution for academic support and community engagement in Gabiley.

== Facilities and Services ==
The library provides a range of daily services designed to support learning and literacy development. These services include organized reading spaces across three floors, allowing visitors to study in a quiet and structured environment. The library also operates a reader registration system, which helps track usage and encourage consistent reading habits among visitors. In addition, the library provides designated areas for children. These spaces are designed to encourage early reading habits and support young learners in developing interest in books and education. By creating a child-friendly environment, the library contributes to early childhood literacy development in the community. The library also offers dedicated study spaces for university and school teachers. These areas are used for preparing lessons, developing teaching materials, and conducting examinations. This service supports educators in improving the quality of instruction provided in schools and higher education institutions.

=== Workshops and Educational Programs ===
The Gabiley National Library organizes a variety of workshops aimed at improving knowledge and skills within the community. These workshops cover different topics, including reading awareness, health education, social issues, technology, and general education. Reading awareness workshops are designed to promote a culture of reading among students and the wider community. Health-related workshops focus on public health awareness and basic health education. Social issue workshops address topics relevant to community development and social well-being. Technology workshops introduce participants to basic digital skills and modern tools, while educational workshops support academic improvement and learning strategies. These programs are designed to be inclusive and accessible to different age groups, including children, and adults. Through these activities, the library plays a role in community education beyond traditional book lending services.

== Community Role and Impact ==
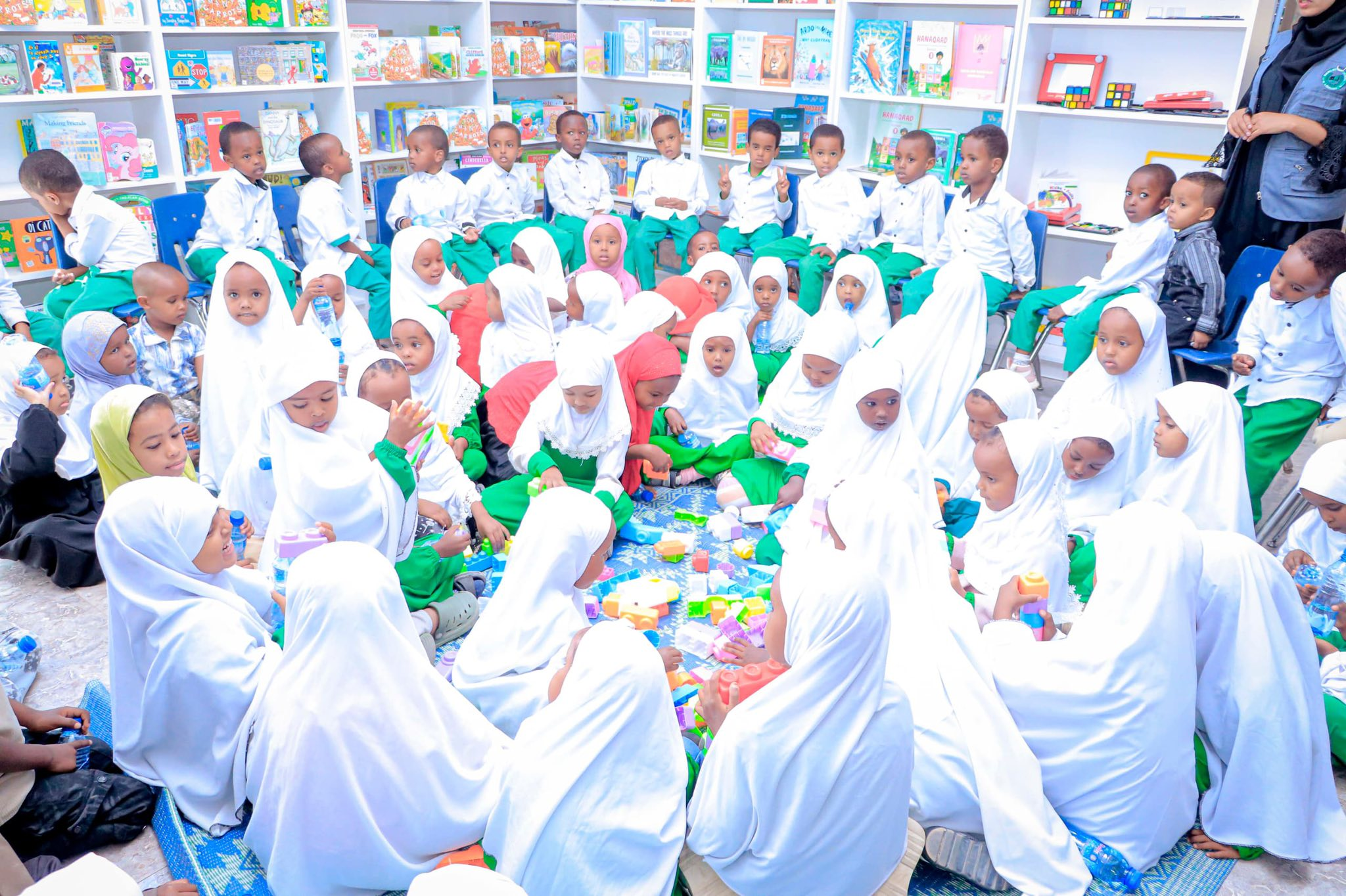
Photo Gabiley National library

The Gabiley National Library functions as an important educational and social space for the local community. It provides an environment where individuals can study, access information, and participate in learning activities. The library has contributed to increasing awareness of the importance of education and reading in the region. It also serves as a meeting place for students, teachers, and community members, supporting collaboration and knowledge exchange. Through its services and programs, the library supports personal development and lifelong learning. According to available local information, the library receives a steady number of visitors throughout the year, serving as an active educational center for the population of Gabiley.

== Usage and Visitors ==
The library is used by a wide range of visitors, including students, educators, and community members. It provides an organized and accessible environment for academic study and personal learning. The number of visitors reflects its importance as an educational institution in the region. The library receives approximately 1,100 visitors per month, with an estimated annual total of around 32,000 visitors.

== Conclusion ==
The Gabiley National Library and Community Center plays a significant role in supporting education, literacy, and community development in Gabiley. Since its establishment in 2019 and opening in 2021, it has developed into an important institution for learning and public engagement. Through its reading spaces, educational programs, workshops, and community services, the library continues to contribute to the intellectual and social development of the region.

== See also ==
- Berbera Public Library
- National Library of Somaliland
- List of national and state libraries
