= Gabiley District =

Coordinates: 9.7003°N 43.6244°E

Gabiley Degmada Gabiley
- District
- Location of Gabiley District, Maroodi Jeex region, Somaliland
- Country: Somaliland
- Region: Maroodi Jeex
- Capital: Gabiley

Population (2005)
  - Total: 79,564
- Time zone: UTC+3 (EAT)

Gabiley District (Somali: Degmada Gabiley) is a district in the Maroodi Jeex province of Somaliland, with its capital in Gabiley.

== Demographics ==
The broader Gabiley District has a total population of 420,430. It has been considered to be the fastest growing population district in Somaliland due to its fertile land.

The Gabiley District is inhabited by people from the Somali ethnic group. This district is dominated by the Jibril Abokor and Abdalla Abokor sub divisions of the Sa'ad Musa subclan of the Habar Awal Isaaq.

== Townships ==
The majority of the people in the district have been settled there for the last 300 years. There are more major and minor towns in Gabiley district than anywhere else in Somaliland. Major towns:

- Allaybaday
- Arabsiyo
- Gabiley, the capital of the district
- Tog Wajaale
- Kalabaydh

Minor towns:

- Agabar
- El Bardale

== Agriculture ==
The majority of Somaliland food production is found in this region, making up to 85% of Somaliland food sources. It grows apples, oranges, bananas, crops, corn, maize, wheat, barley, beans, lemon, peas, groundnuts, potatoes, tomatoes, onions, garlic, cabbages, carrots, watermelons, papayas, and many other types of fruits and vegetables.

== See also ==
- Administrative divisions of Somaliland
- Regions of Somaliland
- Districts of Somaliland
