= Berbera Public Library =

Library in Somaliland

- Maktabadda Dadweynaha ee Berbera
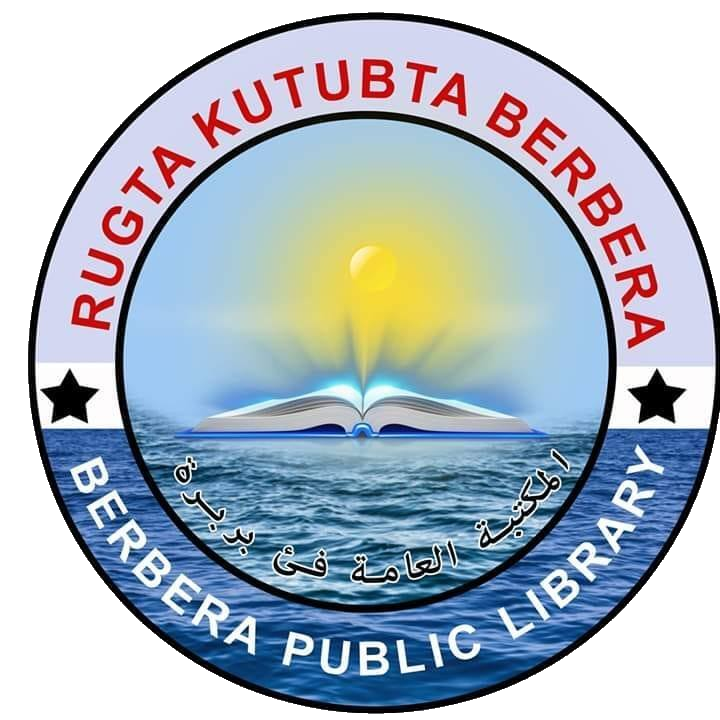

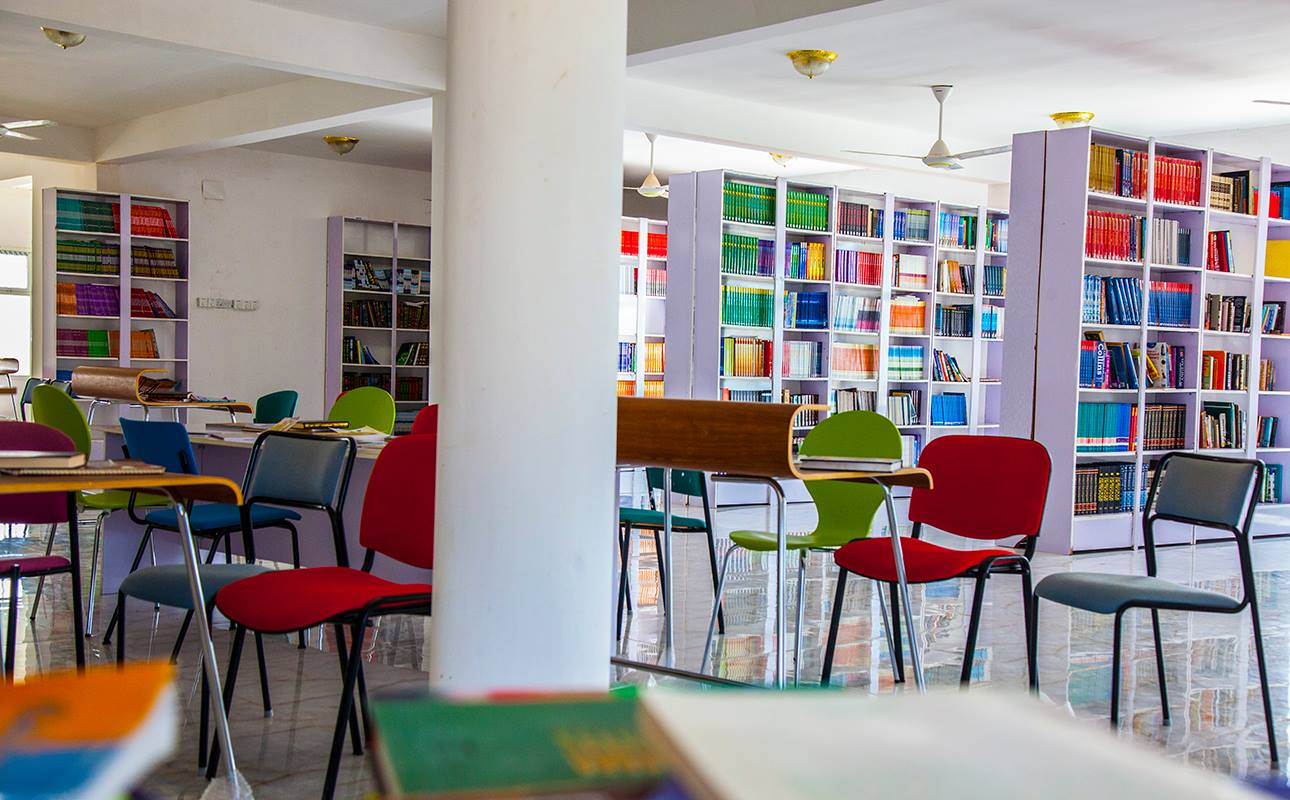
- The library interior
- 10°26′06″N 45°00′23″E
- Location: Berbera, Somaliland
- Type: Public library
- Established: 5 April 2018
- Architects: Rio Architects
- Branch of: National Library of Somaliland

Collection
- Items collected: 15,000 books

Access and use
- Access requirements: Open to the public

Other information
- Affiliation: Berbera County Council

Berbera Public Library (Somali: Maktabadda Dadweynaha ee Berbera), is the main public library in the city centre of Berbera, Somaliland. The first library in Berbera was opened in 2014. It was later expanded and is now known as the Berbera Public Library.

== History ==
The idea of Berbera Public Library was born and announced on 29 February 2011, in a meeting gathered by Berbera Reader Club, formed of local scholars, elders and businessmen, held in Berbera Maritime and Fisheries Academy Hall.

In 2013, the government cleared a spot for the library to be built and the local government had successfully relocated the people who used to live in that area. In the same year, the former Somaliland president Ahmed Mohamed Mahmoud, laid the first very stone as a symbol of the beginning of the construction of the library.

In 2014 the Mayor of Berbera Mr. Abdishakuur Mahmoud Hassan (Ciddin), assigned a committee for the building and management of the library. The team contained five members from the community. The first phase of construction was started in late 2014 and during that time a large hall and fence was established successfully. Between December 2015 and December 2017, the rest of the construction for the library was completed. The construction was funded mostly by local government. The grand opening of the library was held on 22 April 2018. The library contains over 15,000 books, on a wide variety of subjects.

In 2022, a number of computers were donated to the library by the Taiwan Representative Office and a US based charity named SimplyHelp Foundation.

== See also ==
- Gabiley National Library
- National Library of Somaliland
- List of national and state libraries
