= Kalabaydh =

- Town
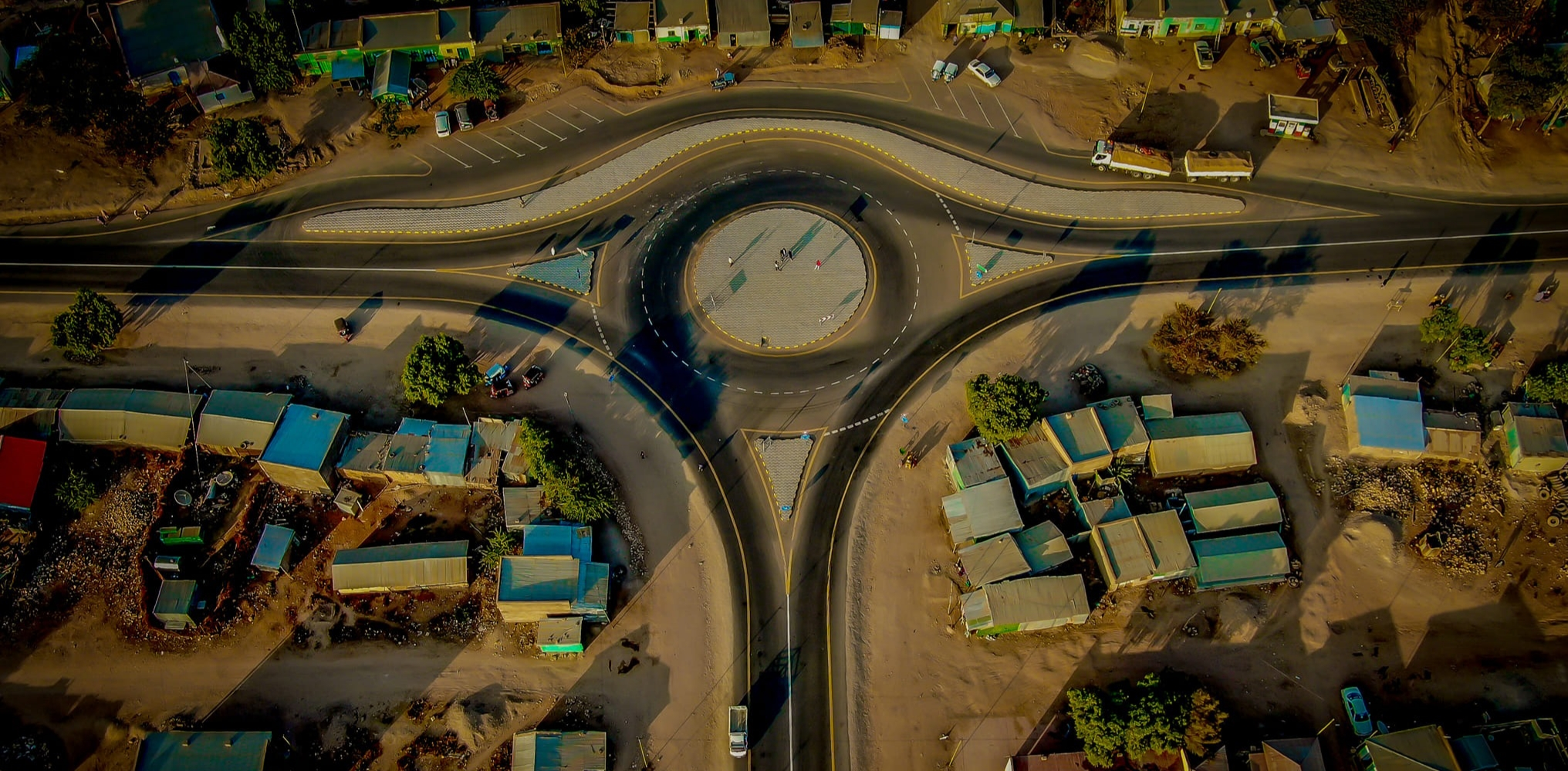

- Location within Somaliland
- Coordinates: 9°40′52.8″N 43°28′40.2″E
- Country: Somaliland
- Region: Maroodi Jeex
- District: Gabiley District
- Time zone: UTC+3 (EAT)

Kalabaydh is a town which is part of the Maroodi Jeex region of Somaliland, and sits on the junction of highways connecting Gabiley, Wajaale and Borama.

== Demographics ==
The total population of Kalabaydh is 50,000 and is primarily inhabited by the Jibril Abokor sub divisions of the Sa'ad Musa subclan of the Habar Awal Isaaq.

== Economy ==
Kalabaydh's mainly comes from the local customs station which generates significant revenue by taxing imported Khat.
