= Abdillahi Suldaan Mohammed Timacade =

Abdillahi Suldaan Mohammed
- عبد الله سلطان محمد
- Born: Cabdillaahii Suuldaan Maxamed; 1920; Gabiley, British Somaliland
- Died: 6 February 1973 (aged 52–53); Kalabaydh, Somali Republic
- Occupation: Poet
- Writing career
- Pen name: Timacade

Abdillahi Suldaan Mohammed (Somali: Cabdilaahi Suldaan Maxamed, Arabic: عبد الله سلطان محمد), known as Timacade, was a Somali poet. He was one of the most prominent bards of his day.

== Biography ==
Timacade was born in 1920 in the small town of Galooley, situated near Gabiley in British Somaliland, now (Somalia). He hailed from the Jibril Abokor, a Sa'ad Musa sub-division of the Habr Awal Isaaq clan that inhabits the area around the Gabiley region.

In Galooley, Abdillahi Suldaan attended the local Qur’anic school. In his early teens he started composing and reciting poetry (initially, he could neither read nor write). His father and mother died when Abdillahi was very young. In 1936, Abdillahi Suldaan migrated to Harar, where he worked in a restaurant owned by one of his uncles. After having spent some time in Ethiopia and Djibouti in the 1940s and 1950s, he returned to Gabiley and took part in the independence movements against the then ruling British administration of the former British Somaliland protectorate.

Timacade was famous for his numerous poems, particularly his one euphoric paean to liberty that marked the 26 June 1960 celebrations of Somalia's independence from the British and pending reunification with Somalia 5 days later to form the Somali Republic.

In the mid-1960s, he joined the Somali Democratic Union (SDU) and became its main poet, continuing his anticlanist themes. He later refused to vote in the 1967 elections and welcomed the October 1969 coup d'état.

== Last years and death ==
In his early fifties, he suffered from a throat illness. He was eventually taken to Jomo Kenyatta Hospital in Nairobi, the capital of Kenya, to undergo a number of treatments. Timacade died on 6 February 1973, aged 52 or 53, in Kalabaydh, Somaliland. He was buried in Gabiley.

== See also ==
- Hadrawi
- Hassan Sheikh Mumin
- Gaariye
- Hadraawi
- Elmi Boodhari
- Mohamed Sulayman Tubeec

== Sources ==
- Saylici Press, Gabaygii calanka ee Timocade: Kaana Siib kana Saar
