= Allaybaday =

Town in Maroodi Jeex, Somaliland

- Town
- Location within Marodi Jeh Location within Somaliland
- Coordinates: 9°23′13″N 43°31′03″E
- Country: Somaliland
- Region: Maroodi Jeex
- District: Gabiley District
- Elevation: 1,125 m (3,691 ft)
- Time zone: UTC+3 (EAT)
- Area code: +252

Allaybaday is a town in the Maroodi Jeex region of Somaliland, on the border with Ethiopia. It is exclusively inhabited by the Abdalla Abokor, Sa'ad Musa branch of the Habar Awal sub clan of the Isaaq. Allaybaday District has 120.000 population (2022) Allaybaday District has 120.000 population (2022)

According to a 2002 Somaliland government document, Allaybaday is the 9th most important district in Maroodi Jeex, with a district classification of D.

== Agriculture ==
The Allaybaday district produces tons of tomatoes and onions every month during the rainy season.

== Recent history ==
In early 1979, two Western Somali Liberation Front (WSLF) fighters raped a woman between Tog Wajaale and Allaybaday, and in retaliation her teenage brother shot and killed the fighters. The WSLF commander then executed the brother and his family. This was one of the triggers of the fighting between the WSLF and the Somali National Movement.

In 1987, the Somali National Movement rebelled against the Somali President. At this time, there were seven Somali military garrisons in northwestern Somalia, including Allaybaday.

In January 1988, the Somali armed forces 12th Division executed about 20 civilians in Allaybaday. This is considered to be one of the abuses committed by Somali armed forces against Isaaq.

=== After the Declaration of Independence of Somaliland ===
In January 2004, following discussions between UNICEF and the local administration, the Maternal and Child Health (MCH) center resumed operations in Allaybaday.

According to a 2006 Interpeace report, the spread of sedentary agriculture and fenced pasturelands in the Allaybaday area has increased conflict, resulting in a conflict with the Allaybaday area on the Ethiopian side.

In February 2006, Somaliland's Minister of Environment reported that foreigners hired by Gabiley merchants were destroying forests near Allaybaday district.

In April 2007, flash flooding in Allaybaday destroyed 87 of the 105 embankment dams.

In October 2008, a fire broke out at a gas station in Allaybaday, resulting in the loss of 10 stores.

In December 2013, the President of Somaliland visited Allaybaday district and laid the foundation for a road connecting Allaybaday and Hargeisa.

In April 2014, Allaybaday district governor Keyse Maxamed Ibraahim (Keyse Meegaar) visited Gabiley to demand the release of arrested Allaybaday residents.

On May 7, 2015, the Somaliland Minister of Interior appointed Maxamed Xasan Shiil as mayor of Allaybaday.

In July 2015, Allaybaday's traditional leaders held a press conference in Hargeisa, denying that there is any new leadership elected by the community.

In March 2016, the Somaliland government provided water and food assistance to Allaybaday, whose well was failing.

In September 2017, Presidential candidate Muse Bihi Abdi visited Allaybaday.

In December 2019, two civilians were killed by police officers in Allaybaday.

In February 2021, the first paved road built in Allaybaday was opened.

== See also ==
- Administrative divisions of Somaliland
- Regions of Somaliland
- Districts of Somaliland
