= Faraweyne =

Town in Maroodi Jeex, Somaliland

Faraweyne ፋራዌይን
- Town
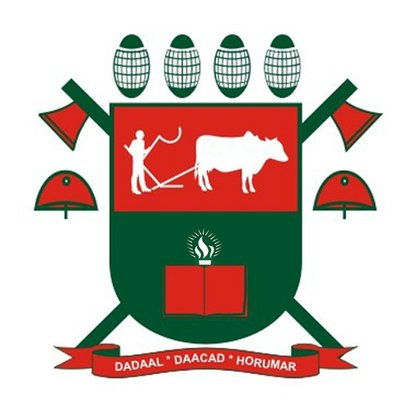
- Seal

- Location within Marodi Jeh Location within Somaliland
- Coordinates: 9°19′55″N 43°40′13″E
- Country: Somaliland
- Region: Maroodi Jeex
- Time zone: UTC+3 (EAT)

Faraweyne (Somali: Faraweyne) is a town in the Maroodijeex region of Somaliland close to the border with Ethiopia. It is also close to the town of Allaybaday on the border. Faraweyne is exclusively inhabited by people from the Somali ethnic group, with the Sa'ad Musa subclan of the Habar Awal Isaaq dominating the town.

== See also ==
- Administrative divisions of Somaliland
- Regions of Somaliland
- Districts of Somaliland
