= Aw Muhammad =

18th-century Muslim saint and scholar

- Imam of Anajina, Imam of Bale
- Reign: 1783 - 1793
- Predecessor: Position established
- Successor: Imam Abdullah Muhammad
- Born: 18th century Berbera, Isaaq Sultanate, present-day Somaliland
- Died: 1793; Sheikh Hussein, Emirate of Harar
- Burial: Sheikh Hussein
Names
- Aw Muhammad Aliy (Tilma Tilmo)
- Religion: Sunni Islam

Aw Muhammad Aliy (Somali: Aw Maxamed, Harari: አው ሙሐመድ), also known as Shaykh Muhammad Tilma Tilmo, was an 18th-century Somali Islamic scholar and saint originating from the port town of Berbera. He is recognized for his role in promoting Islam among the Arsi Oromo in south eastern Ethiopia and for constructing the site at Anaajina (Dirre Sheikh Hussein), which subsequently became an important center of Islamic pilgrimage.

== Background ==
Aw Muhammad Aliy, who later acquired the epithet Tilma-Tilmo, was a scholar of Somali Isaaq origin. His personal name, Aw Muhammad Aliy, reflects his status as a learned religious figure. The epithet Tilma-Tilmo, which can be translated as "The Sagacious," emphasizes his moral authority, intellectual acumen, and sound judgment rather than physical strength.

He was born into the Isaaq clan, a prominent tribal group in the northern coastal regions corresponding to present-day Somaliland. Aw Muhammad Aliy subsequently relocated from Berbera to Harar, where he became a respected scholar and religious authority. He is credited with introducing Islam to the largely non-Muslim Arsi Oromo of Bale, where he was appointed as Imam. His lineage continued to provide religious leadership in the region until 1974.

== Biography ==
=== Mission in Bale ===
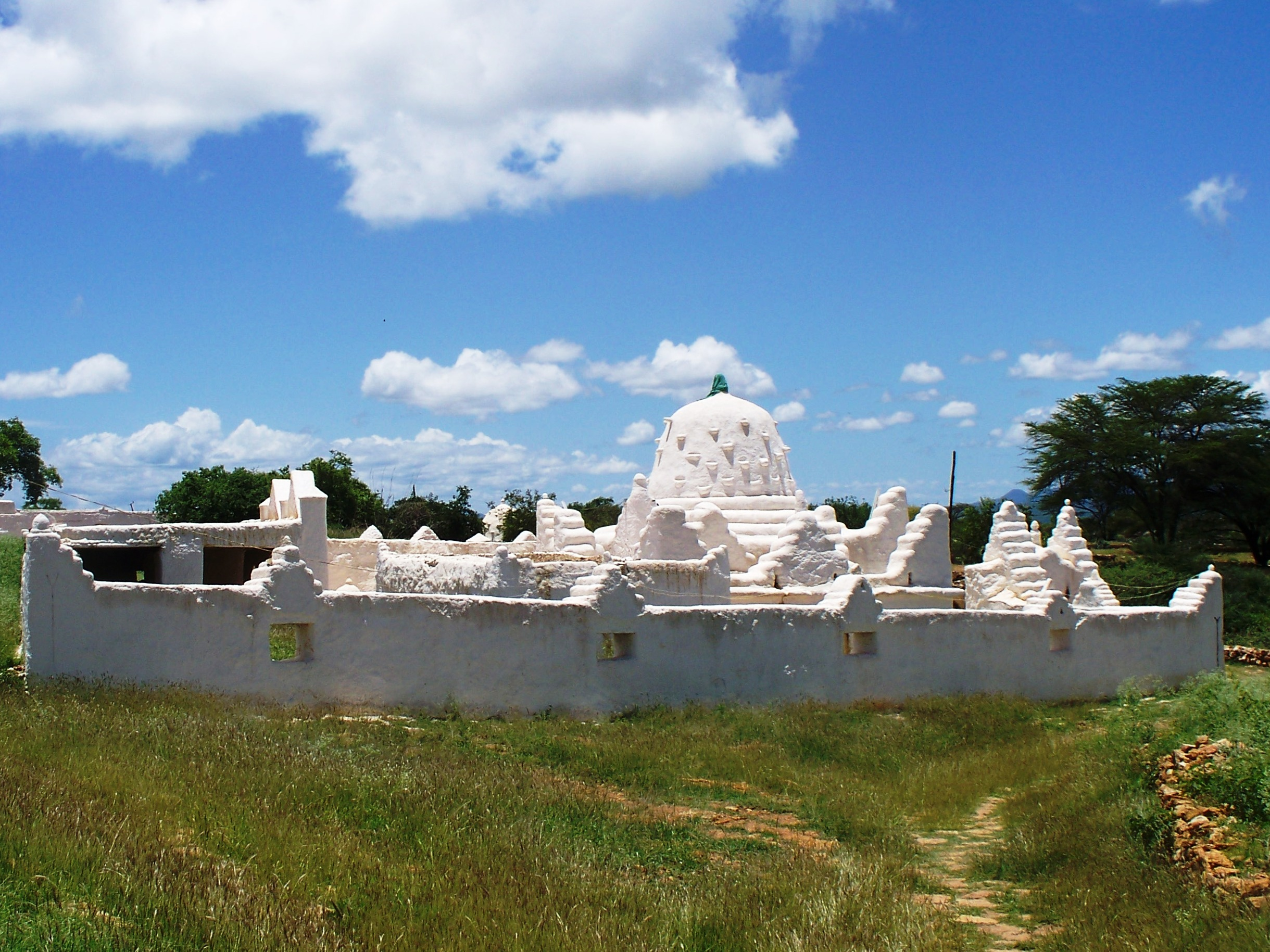
Shrine constructed by Aw Muhammad in 1786

During the 18th century, Aw Muhammad played a central role in the Islamization of the Arsi Oromo population in southern Ethiopia. Sultan 'Abd al-Shakur of Harar recognized the limited presence of Islamic institutions in the Bale region and commissioned Aw Muhammad to undertake religious and scholarly missions, including the construction of a shrine to consolidate Islamic influence.

The Arsi had migrated to the Bale region during the mid-16th century, and Islamic influence in the area remained limited for over two centuries. Sultan 'Abd al-Shakur, acknowledging the need for an established religious center, directed Aw Muhammad to construct a shrine dedicated to Abd al-Qadir al-Jilani adjacent to the tomb of Nur Husayn, who held local spiritual significance. This shrine became central to Aw Muhammad's efforts to integrate Islamic practices among the Arsi population.

=== Aw Abbas’ Revolt ===
Oral traditions indicate that Aw Muhammad was guided by a dream in which Sheikh Hussein called upon him to propagate Islam and revive the shrine at Bale. Another scholar, Sheikh Abbas, reportedly from Argobba enclaves in northern Arsi, arrived and initially contested the leadership of the shrine. Aw Muhammad defeated Shaykh Abbas and established his authority as the designated imam of Dirre Sheikh Hussein, while Sheikh Abbas and his descendants assumed a subsidiary role, contributing to the dissemination of Islamic knowledge, facilitating pilgrimages, and providing instruction in basic Islamic principles.

The Islamization process in Bale expanded in response to policies under Emperor Yohannes IV, which prompted Muslim populations to migrate to Bale for greater religious autonomy. Emir Abd-Shakur of the Emirate of Harar supported the conversion of local Oromo communities, commissioning religious infrastructure, including mosques, and promoting Islamic education.

== Legacy ==
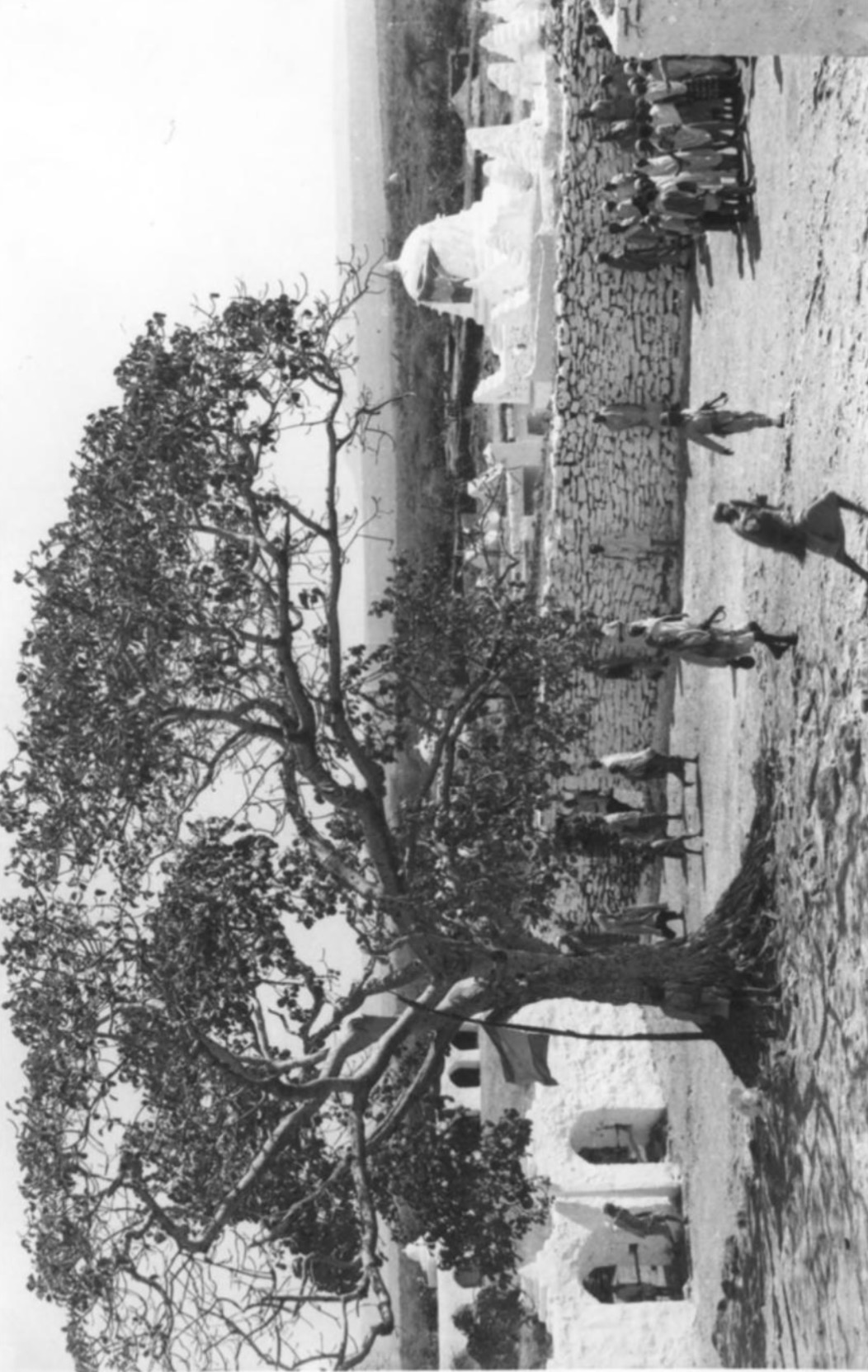
Sheikh Hussein in 1960

The shrine at Anaajina became a prominent site of spiritual and cultural significance. It encompassed not only the tomb of Abd al-Qadir al-Jilani but also various features such as the Dinkiro pond, regarded for its sacred waters, and numerous caves considered spiritually important. Over time, the site integrated Islamic practices with local Oromo customs, with Aw Muhammad's descendants blending Qadiriya Sufi teachings with elements of indigenous religious practice.

Aw Muhammad's contributions established the foundation for the Islamization of the Arsi population, culminating in the mid-20th century. The Anaajina complex, recognized by UNESCO, continues to attract pilgrims and functions as a testament to his influence in the religious and cultural development of the region. The hereditary guardians, known as the Darga, trace their lineage to the early attendants of Sheikh Muhammad Tilma Tilmo.

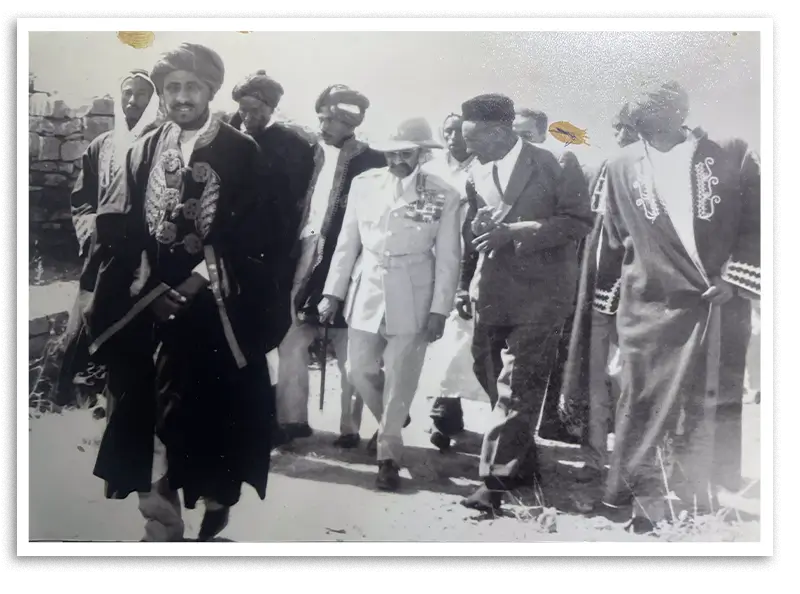
Haile Selassie’s visit to Sheikh Hussein in 1964. The figure at the front dressed in black is Imam Mahmud Sayyid

Aw Muhammad Aliy's descendants continued to serve as Imams of Anaajina, maintaining religious and administrative authority in Bale. In 1936, following the Italian occupation of Ethiopia, his fourth great-grandson, Imam Mahmud Sayid, was crowned Imam of Bale, consolidating both spiritual and administrative leadership within the family. The dynasty retained authority until 1974, when the Derg regime abolished the position.

The site's broader significance was recognized during Emperor Haile Selassie's 1964 visit, during which he observed customary practices such as removing his shoes upon entering the shrine, demonstrating acknowledgment of the local religious traditions and the enduring influence of Aw Muhammad's lineage.
