= Togo Wuchale =

Town in Somali region, Ethiopia

Togo Wuchale Wajaale (Somali) ቶግ ውጫሌ (Amharic) وجالَه (Arabic)
- City
- Location in Ethiopia Togo Wuchale (Somaliland)
- Coordinates: 9°36′05″N 43°20′10″E
- Country: Ethiopia
- Region: Somali region

Population
  - Total: 50,450
- Time zone: UTC+3 (EAT)

Tog Wuchale (also known as Wajaale) is a city located in Eastern Ethiopia on the border of Ethiopia and Somaliland. Tog Wajaale is the main border crossing for goods coming in and out of Ethiopia, primarily from the port city of Berbera, Somaliland's main port. It is one of the busiest border towns of Ethiopia. The city is exclusively inhabited by people from the Somali ethnic group, with the population consisting of the Jibril Abokor (Aadan Cumar) sub-divisions of the Sa'ad Musa subclan of the Habar Awal Isaaq dominating the town and wider district.
