= El Bardale =

Locality in Gobalka Gabiley, Somaliland

El Bardale Ceel Bardaale
- Locality
- Location within Marodi Jeh Location within Somaliland
- Coordinates: 9°49′27″N 43°28′33″E
- Country: Somaliland
- Region: Maroodi Jeex
- District: Gabiley District
- Time zone: UTC+3 (EAT)

El Bardale (Somali: Ceel Bardaale) is a town located in northwestern Gabiley District in the Maroodi Jeex region of Somaliland.

== Overview ==
It is an agricultural town. Most of the residents are primarily farmers that raise livestock animals such as camels, cattle, goats, sheep and even chickens.

== Demographics ==
-family.

The settlement is also inhabited by members of the isaaq clan, particularly the Jibriil Abokor lineage of the Habar Awal subclan. Historically, these communities have shared the area and have been engaged in pastoralism, small-scale agriculture and regional trade.

According to local administrative estimates and community-based counts conducted around 2020, the population of the town has increased compared to earlier figures, reflecting gradual demographic growth and settlement expansion in the surrounding rural areas.
