= Dhaboolaq =

- Town
- Location in Somaliland Dhaboolaq (Somaliland)
- Coordinates: 9°30′11″N 43°51′40″E
- Country: Somaliland
- Region: Maroodi Jeex
- District: Hargeisa
- Time zone: UTC+3 (EAT)

Dhaboolaq is a town in the Maroodi Jeex region of Somaliland The village has a significant ownership lineage tracing back to the Saad Musa clan, specifically the Ahmed Abdalle and Nuh Ismail sub-tribes. The village is well known for its abundant water wells, which attract large numbers of livestock, including camels, cattle, and sheep, seeking water. Additionally, Dhaboolaq is renowned for its thriving agriculture, with numerous farms visible to visitors exploring the area.

== See also ==
- Administrative divisions of Somaliland
- Regions of Somaliland
- Districts of Somaliland
