= National Library of Somaliland =

Silanyo National Library
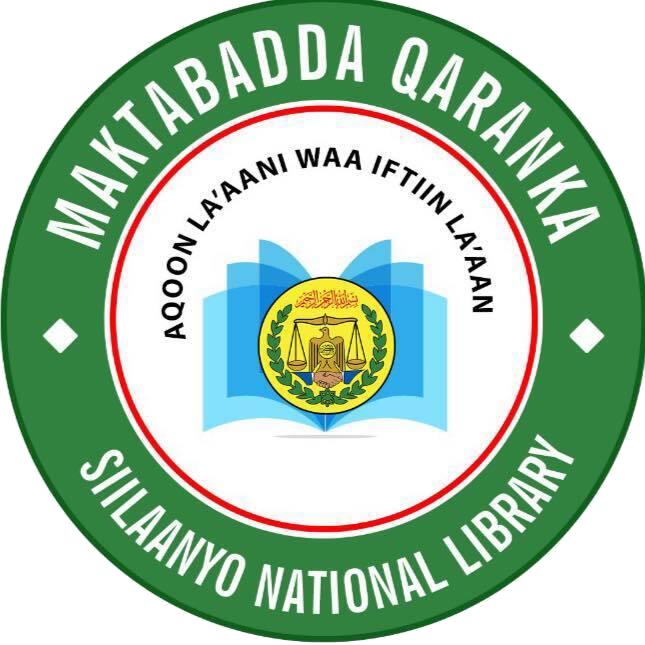

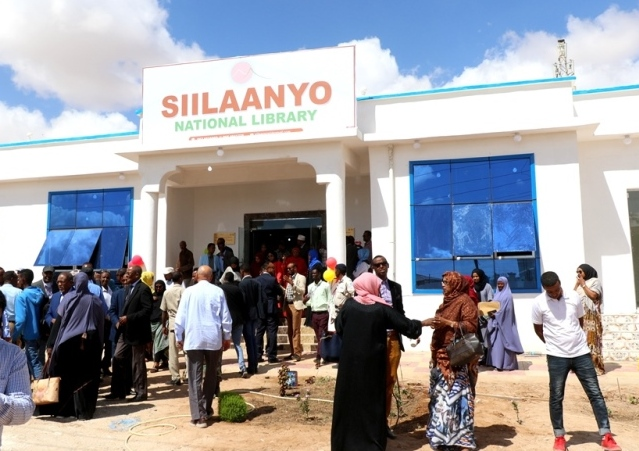
- Location: Hargeisa, Somaliland
- Established: December 2017; 8 years ago

Access and use
- Population served: open to the public

Other information
- Director: Ahmed Dahir Elmi (since 2017)

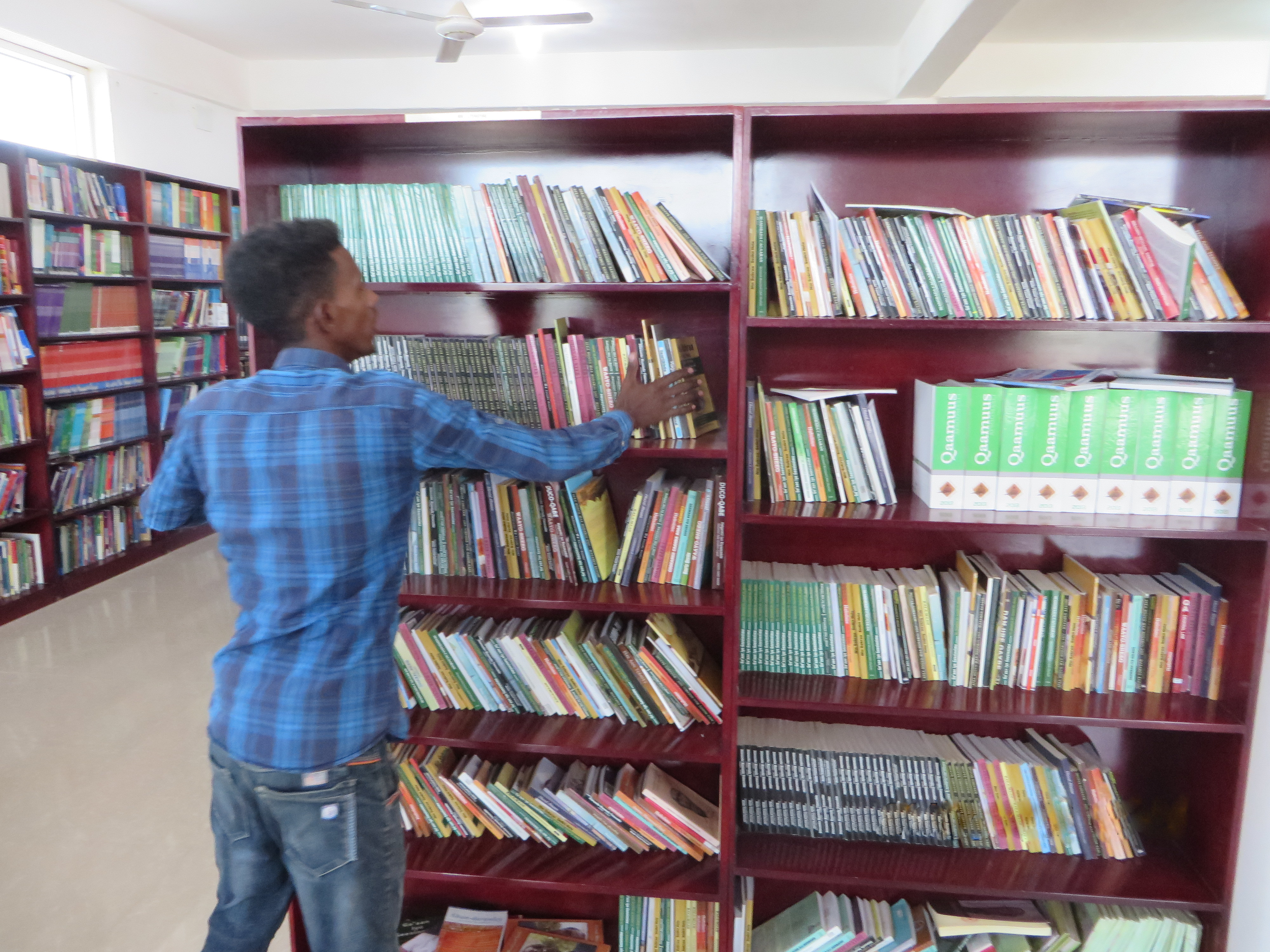
A young librarian arranging books. The National Library at Hargeysa, Somaliland

National Library of Somaliland or Silanyo National Library is the national library of Somaliland. It is located in Hargeisa, the capital of Somaliland, and is the first and largest national library in Somaliland.

== Overview ==
The library was founded in December 2017 and is named after the former president of Somaliland, Ahmed Mohamed Mohamoud, who inaugurated the library.

== See also ==
- List of national and state libraries
- Berbera Public Library
- Legal deposit
- National library
