= Agabar =

- Town
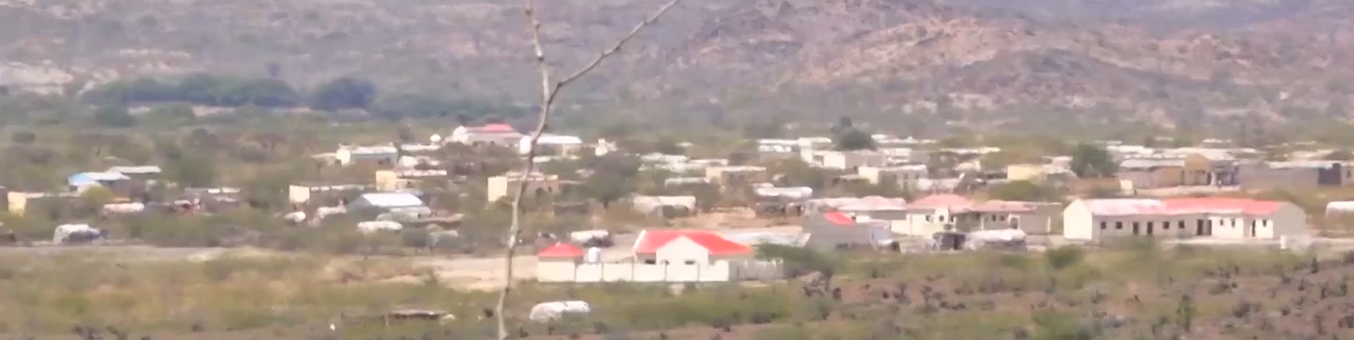
- Panoramic view of Agabar

- Location within Marodi Jeh Location within Somaliland
- Coordinates: 9°55′N 43°55′E
- Country: Somaliland
- Region: Maroodi Jeex
- District: Gabiley District
- Time zone: UTC+3 (EAT)

Agabar is a sizeable town in the Maroodi Jeex region of Somaliland. It is located in the northeastern side of Gabiley District.

== Demographics ==
The total population of Agabar is 6,547 and is primarily inhabited by people from the Somali ethnic group, with the Jibril Abokor (Bahabar Adan) sub divisions of the Sa'ad Musa subclan of the Habar Awal Isaaq making up the traditional residents of this town.

== See also ==
- Administrative divisions of Somaliland
- Regions of Somaliland
- Districts of Somaliland
