= Iskudar =

- Village
- Location in Somaliland. Iskudar (Somaliland)
- Coordinates: 9°54′22.1″N 44°59′01.1″E
- Country: Somaliland
- Region: Togdheer
- Time zone: UTC+3 (EAT)

Iskudar is a village in the Togdheer region of Somaliland. The closest airport is the Berbera Airport which is distanced 55 km from Iskudar.
