= Ahmed Mohamed Mahmoud =

- Born: c. 1974; Egypt
- Died: February 4, 2011; Cairo, Egypt
- Occupation: Journalist
- Known for: The first journalist killed during Egyptian Arab Spring uprising
- Spouse(s): Inas Abdel-Alim, also spelled Enas

Ahmed Mohamed Mahmoud (c. 1974 – 4 February 2011) was an Egyptian print reporter for the newspaper Al Tawuun, which is distributed by state-run Al-Ahram. He was shot by a sniper on the balcony of his office while filming the outbreak between Egyptian protestors and security forces on January 28, 2011 during the 2011 Egyptian Revolution. He died six days later in a local Cairo hospital, and he was the first journalist to die in Egypt during its Arab Spring uprising.

== Death ==
Mahmoud was shot on his office balcony as riot police were throwing tear gas canisters into crowds of protesters. His office was located near central Tahrir Square which was the central point of fighting between anti-Mubarak and pro-Mubarak forces. Mahmoud was shot by a sniper while filming the incident on his camera phone. Several witnesses have said a uniformed policeman yelled at Mahmoud to stop filming amidst the violence right before he was shot without any time to react. His co-workers called the ambulance several times as they refused to pick him up because of the nature of his attack. They had to drive him themselves to Al Ainy Hospital, the largest hospital in Egypt where he would slip into a coma and die of his wounds six days later on February 4, 2011.

== Context ==
At the end of the thirty years of President Hosni Mubarak's leadership, Egypt suffered from economic instability, political corruption, starvation, high unemployment rates, and the presence of a 'youth bulge'. All of these are seen as reasons for the 2011 protests. According to 2011 World Bank figures, Egypt's economy grew at a rate of 4.5 percent which was exceptionally well for a third world country. Egyptian corruption levels according to World Transparency reports were ranked 80th. Though levels of political corruption were high, they were low in comparison to almost all other third world nations. What is believed to be the true reason for the political strife is the youth bulge. Due to rapidly increasing life expectancy and rapidly decreasing infant mortality rate people aged 20–24 had doubled since 1995. Just prior to the beginning of the peaceful protests nearly half of the unemployed were part of this youth cohort aged 20–24. Large numbers of youth have been historically responsible for political conflict. In Egypt reasons such as conflicting ideologies were responsible. Of the nearly 2.5 million youth unemployed, 43 percent had university degrees. This can be seen as why the protests were non-violent and of the 300 deaths nearly all were at the hands of the security forces and none from the protestors.

== Impact ==
Mahmoud was the first reporter killed during the uprising in Egypt between protestors and Mubarak forces. The killing of a journalist and then the unresponsiveness of the ambulance has shaken Egypt's journalism community and furthered protests against the current regime. Mahmoud's widow and fellow journalist, Inas Abdel-Alim, is demanding a full on investigation from the government and a trial for the murder of her husband.

Lucas Dolega, who was the first journalist killed in the Arab Spring uprising during the Tunisian uprising, was also killed while covering a protest. Dolega was on a photojournalism assignment for European PressPhoto Agency (epa) in Tunis.

== Response ==
In response to the killing, White House Press Secretary Robert Gibbs released a statement saying the White House continues to receive, "very disturbing reports". He continued saying, "direct negotiations toward orderly transition" should be made for the power in Egypt. In response to the attack on Mahmoud and others, United States President Barack Obama said in a press conference that the attack were "unacceptable", and the Egyptian government should "protect the rights of the people". A symbolic funeral was held in Tahrir Square in honor of Mahmoud. An empty casket with an Egyptian flag draped over was carried through the streets with thousands of attendees following.

== Personal ==
Mahmoud was married to Inas Abdel-Alim for 11 years and they have one daughter.
