= Gugux =

- Town
- Location in Somaliland Gugux (Somaliland)
- Coordinates: 9°57′54″N 45°24′15″E
- Country: Somaliland
- Region: Sahil

Population (2002)
  - Total: 300
- Time zone: UTC+3 (EAT)

Gugux is a town in the Sahil region of Somaliland.
