= Argobba =

Argobba may refer to:

- Argobba people
- Argobba language
- Argobba special woreda (Afar) in the Afar Region
- Argobba special woreda (Amhara) in the Amhara Region

== See also ==
- Argoba Nationality Democratic Organization
