= Qeedi Haan =

Geedi Haan
- Town
- Location in Somaliland
- Coordinates: 9°01′35″N 45°39′34″E
- Country: Somaliland
- Region: Togdheer
- Time zone: UTC+3 (EAT)

Geedi Haan is a town in the Togdheer region of Somaliland.

== Overview ==
Geedi Haan is located on Somaliland's Togdheer Region

== Demographics ==
As of 2015 Geedi Haan was home to roughly 800 families.It is primarily inhabited by the Reer Biniin Ahmed Farah sub-division of the Habr Je'lo Isaaq.
