= Arabsiyo =

- Town
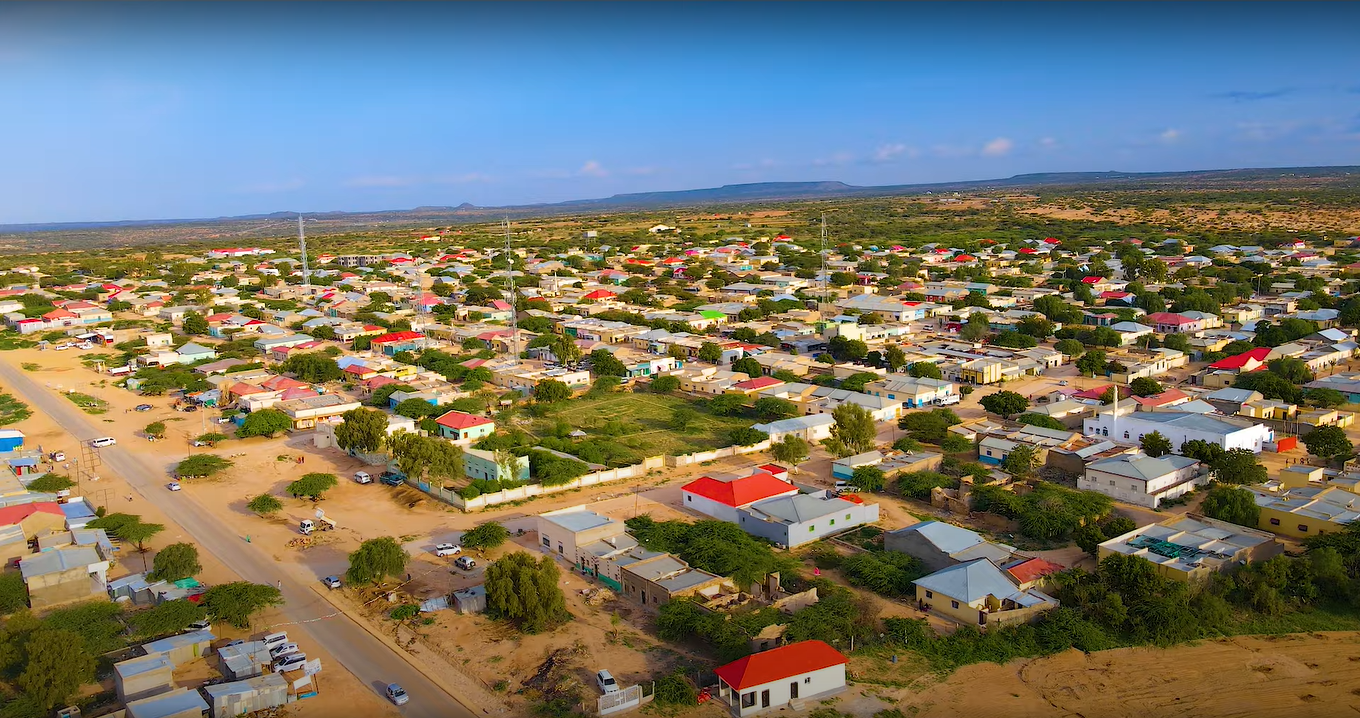
- Arabsiyo skyline

- Location in Somaliland Arabsiyo (Somaliland)
- Coordinates: 9°41′N 43°46′E
- Country: Somaliland
- Region: Maroodi Jeex
- District: Gabiley

Government
  - Type: Mayor-Hamse Sacad Aw-Muuse
  - Deputy Mayor: Mustafe Hamud Balayah
  - Secratory of local government: Koosaar Haji Osman
- Time zone: +3
- Website: arabsiyo.gov.org

Arabsiyo is a town in the Gabiley district of Somaliland. The town is located about 30 km west of Hargeisa.

== Education ==
Primary schools and Secondary schools are available throughout the district.

- Number of Primary Schools – 12
- Number of Secondary Schools – 2

== Climate ==
The climate here is considered to be a local steppe climate. There is consistent precipitation in Arabsiyo. According to Köppen-Geiger system, this climate is classified as (BSh). In Arabsiyo, the average annual temperature is 21.4 °C. The average annual rainfall is 489 mm. The driest month is December, with 2 mm of rain. In August, the precipitation reaches its peak, with an average of 91 mm. June is the warmest month of the year. The temperature in June averages 24.5 °C. At 17.6 °C on average, January is the coldest month of the year. There is a difference of 89 mm of precipitation between the driest and wettest months. The variation in annual temperature is around 6.9 °C.

hideClimate data for Arabsiyo
Month	Jan	Feb	Mar	Apr	May	Jun	Jul	Aug	Sep	Oct	Nov	Dec	Year
Average high °C (°F)	24.6 (76.3)	26.1 (79.0)	28.1 (82.6)	28.6 (83.5)	29.9 (85.8)	30.7 (87.3)	29.2 (84.6)	29.2 (84.6)	29.9 (85.8)	27.9 (82.2)	26 (79)	24.2 (75.6)	27.9 (82.2)
Average low °C (°F)	10.6 (51.1)	12.2 (54.0)	14.4 (57.9)	16.2 (61.2)	17.4 (63.3)	18.3 (64.9)	17.8 (64.0)	17.6 (63.7)	17.4 (63.3)	14.4 (57.9)	12.2 (54.0)	11.2 (52.2)	15.0 (59.0)
Average precipitation mm (inches)	4 (0.2)	11 (0.4)	33 (1.3)	74 (2.9)	63 (2.5)	36 (1.4)	73 (2.9)	91 (3.6)	76 (3.0)	18 (0.7)	8 (0.3)	2 (0.1)	489 (19.3)
Source: Climate-Data.org, altitude: 1460m

== See also ==
- Administrative divisions of Somaliland
- Regions of Somaliland
- Districts of Somaliland
