= Gabiley =

Gabiley Gabiley (Somali) غابيلي (Arabic)
- City
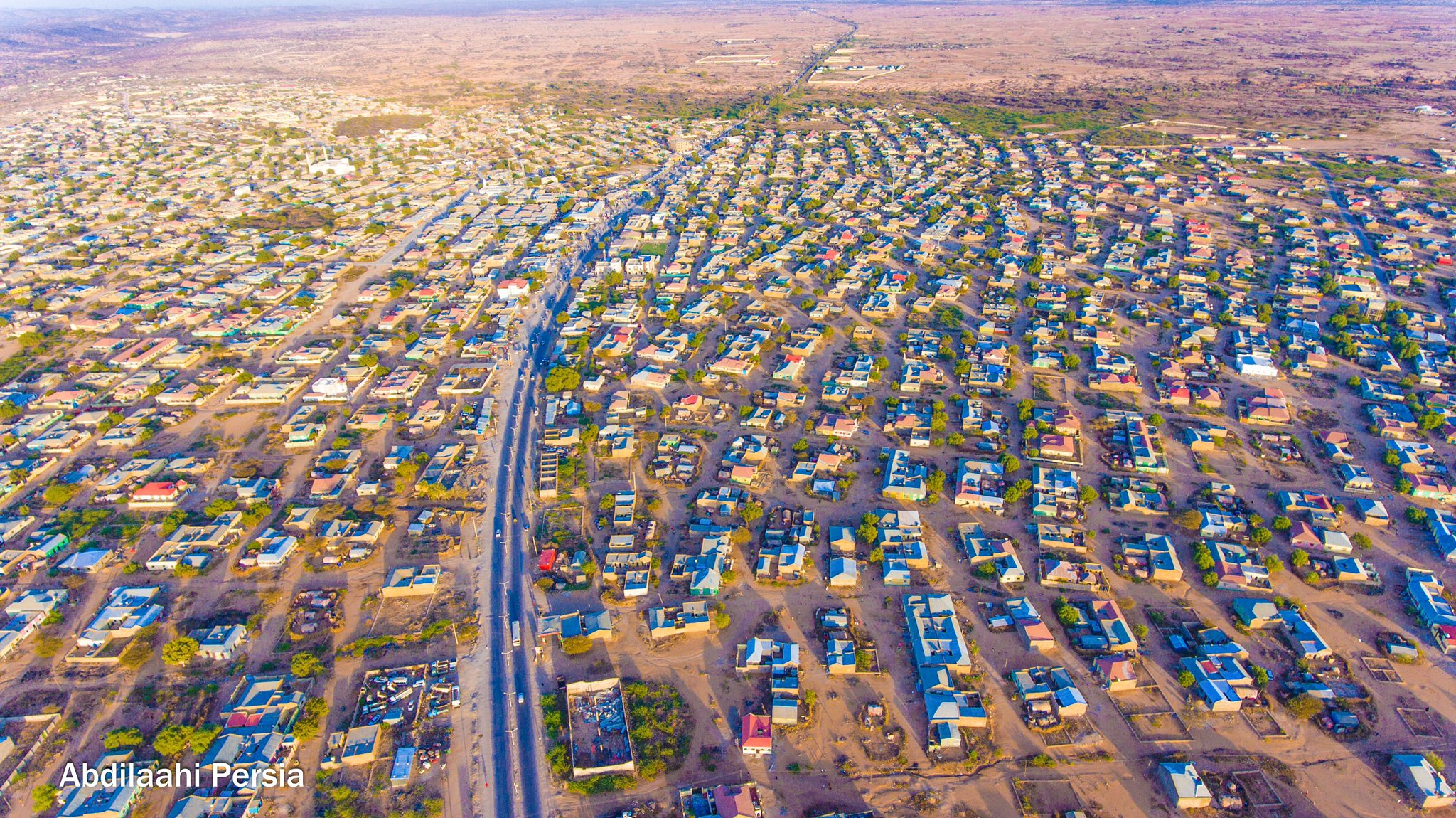
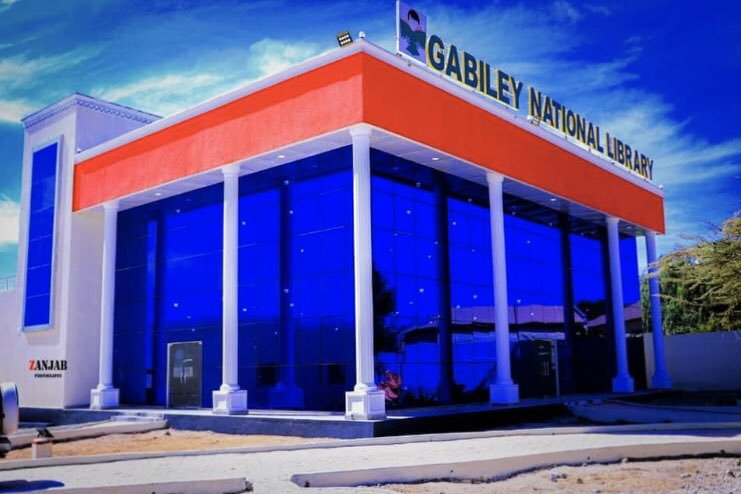
- Gabiley National Library

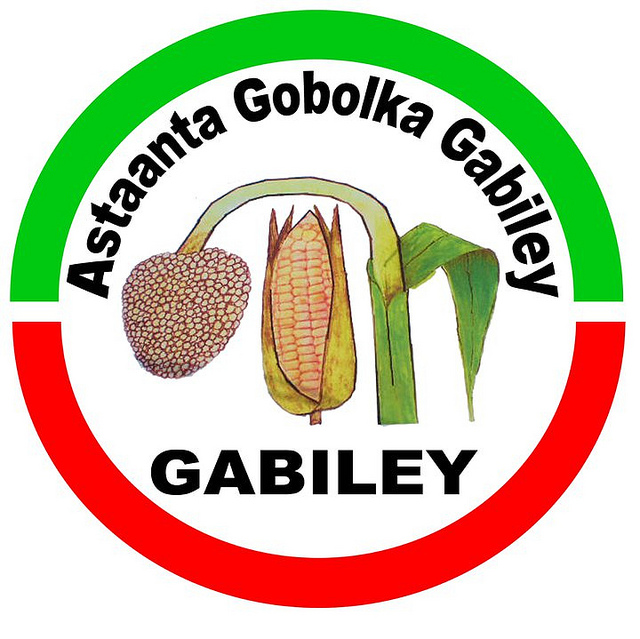
- Seal

- Location in Somaliland Gabiley (Somaliland)
- Coordinates: 9°42′0″N 43°37′25″E
- Country: Somaliland
- Region: Maroodi Jeex
- District: Gabiley

Government
  - Mayor: Mahamed-Amin Omar Abdi

Population
  - Total: 141,000
  - Rank: 7th
- Time zone: UTC+3 (EAT)

Gabiley (Somali: Gabiley, Arabic: غابيلي), also known as Gebiley, is a city in the Maroodi Jeex region of Somaliland.

Gabiley is located 58 km west of Hargeisa, the capital of Somaliland. It is in the center of the Gabiley district, bounded on the north by the Gulf of Aden, on the west by the Awdal region, on the east by the Hargeisa district, and on the south by the Somali Region of Ethiopia.

== Etymology ==
The name Gabiley is derived from the Somali word gebi, which can mean either a cliff or a ridge, depending on interpretation. The name reflects the area's unique topography, characterized by its abundance of cliffs and ridges. Situated within the Qalax Valley, the name reflects the geographical characteristics of the area where the town is situated.

== History ==
Gabiley is one of the oldest towns in Somaliland after Zeila, Berbera and Amud. Some stones left behind in the area were believed to have been earmarked for the construction of pyramids. For example Dhagax Gurre situated around 45km northeast of Gabiley and lies about two Hours drive from Hargeisa the paintings are more than 5000 years old.

It comprises several individual painted shelters scattered on a rocky hill. The main shelter has an inclined ceiling which is decorated with an assemblage of bovid figures as well as one giraffe and one anthropomorphic figure. The second most important shelter, which lies at the base of the granite outcrop, is adorned with panels representing sheep (or goats) and a few human figures holding a bow. The colours and the complexity of the paintings are much less striking than those at Las Geel, but they’re interesting nonetheless.

== Demographics ==
The town of Gabiley has a population of around 141,000.

The Gabiley District in which the city is situated is exclusively dominated by people from the Somali ethnic group, with the Jibril Abokor and Abdalla Abokor sub divisions of the Sa'ad Musa subclan of the Habar Awal Isaaq.

== Education ==
Primary schools, Secondary schools and University education is available throughout the district. The smaller communities have their own primary schools. For post-secondary education, Timacade University was opened in 1999 to serve the needs of the town's students. The education system in Gabiley region is growing in a faster pace than most of Somaliland. Gabiley district has many secondary Schools such as Qalax Secondary, Cigaal Schools, and Al-Irshaad Secondary. The Gabiley National Library opened in April 2021 to provide a suitable space for all Gabiley residents and students to be able to read from the numerous books available.

== Healthcare ==
Gabiley has 6 operating general hospitals. One hospital opened in 2010 and it provides medical services to the larger region.

== Administration ==
In 2016 the municipal government was led by Mahamed-Amiin Omer Abdi, who is the current mayor of Gabiley city and the governor of Gabiley region.

== Agriculture ==
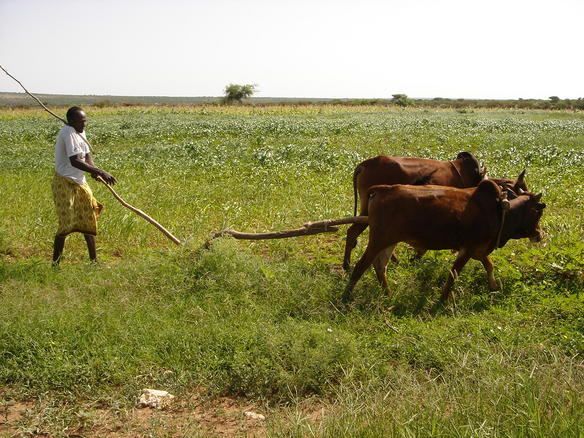
Farmer near the town of Gabiley

Gabiley is the main farm land for Somaliland and produces up to 85% of Somaliland's food supplies. It is known for its agricultural and farming industry, and is where most of Somaliland's crops are produced. Crops grown in the area include apples, oranges, bananas, corn, pears, maize, wheat, barley, beans, lemon, peas, groundnuts, potatoes, tomatoes, onions, garlic, salad and cabbages, broccoli, watermelon, papaya and many other types of fruits and vegetables. Gabiley is considered to be the most fertile region in Somaliland.

== Climate ==
According to Köppen-Geiger system, Gabiley has a hot semi-arid climate (BSh), although it is moderated by altitude. The average annual temperature is 21.4 °C or 70.5 °F, and the average annual rainfall 489 millimetres or 19.25 inches. June is the hottest month of the year with an average of 24.5 °C or 76.1 °F, whilst January is the coolest with an average of 17.6 °C or 63.7 °F. The driest month is December, with 2 millimetres or 0.079 inches of rain, and the wettest August with 91 millimetres or 3.58 inches. There is a difference of 89 millimetres or 3.50 inches of rainfall between the driest and wettest months. The variation in annual temperature is around 6.9 °C or 12.4 °F.

Climate data for Gabiley
Month	Jan	Feb	Mar	Apr	May	Jun	Jul	Aug	Sep	Oct	Nov	Dec	Year
Mean daily maximum °C (°F)	24.6 (76.3)	26.1 (79.0)	28.1 (82.6)	28.6 (83.5)	29.9 (85.8)	30.7 (87.3)	29.2 (84.6)	29.2 (84.6)	29.9 (85.8)	27.9 (82.2)	26 (79)	24.2 (75.6)	27.9 (82.2)
Mean daily minimum °C (°F)	10.6 (51.1)	12.2 (54.0)	14.4 (57.9)	16.2 (61.2)	17.4 (63.3)	18.3 (64.9)	17.8 (64.0)	17.6 (63.7)	17.4 (63.3)	14.4 (57.9)	12.2 (54.0)	11.2 (52.2)	15.0 (59.0)
Average rainfall mm (inches)	4 (0.2)	11 (0.4)	33 (1.3)	74 (2.9)	63 (2.5)	36 (1.4)	73 (2.9)	91 (3.6)	76 (3.0)	18 (0.7)	8 (0.3)	2 (0.1)	489 (19.3)
Source: Climate-Data.org, altitude: 1,460 metres or 4,790 feet

== Notable residents ==
- Abdillahi Suldaan Mohammed Timacade, prominent Somali poet during the pre- and post-colonial period from Galooley who conducted public readings in the area. He belongs to the Ali Jibril (Reer Hareed) sub-clan of the Jibril Abokor clan.
- Mohamed Hasan Abdullahi, former Chief of Staff of Somaliland Armed Forces and SNM General. He belongs to the Ali Jibril (Reer Dalal) sub-clan of the Jibril Abokor clan.
- Mo Farah, British four-time Olympic gold medalist and the most decorated athlete in British athletics history; belongs to the Muhammed Jibril (Deriyahan) sub-clan of the Jibril Abokor clan.
- Nuh Ismail Tani, current Chief of Staff of Somaliland Armed Forces. He belongs to the Ali Jibril (Reer Hareed) of the Jibril Abokor clan.
- John Drysdale, also known as Abbas Idriss, a British-born army officer, diplomat, writer, historian, publisher, and businessman who spent the last years of his life in the city. Most notably, due to his expertise on Somali history and culture, he served as an advisor to UNOSOM II and advocated for a diplomatic resolution to the war raging between UNOSOM II and Mohammed Farah Aidid in 1993. He was also the first ever Caucasian to vote in Somaliland elections.
