= Maroodi Jeex =

Region of Somaliland

Marodi Jeh Maroodi Jeex/مَرودِ جيحْ (Somali) مَرودي جيح (Arabic)
- Region of Somaliland
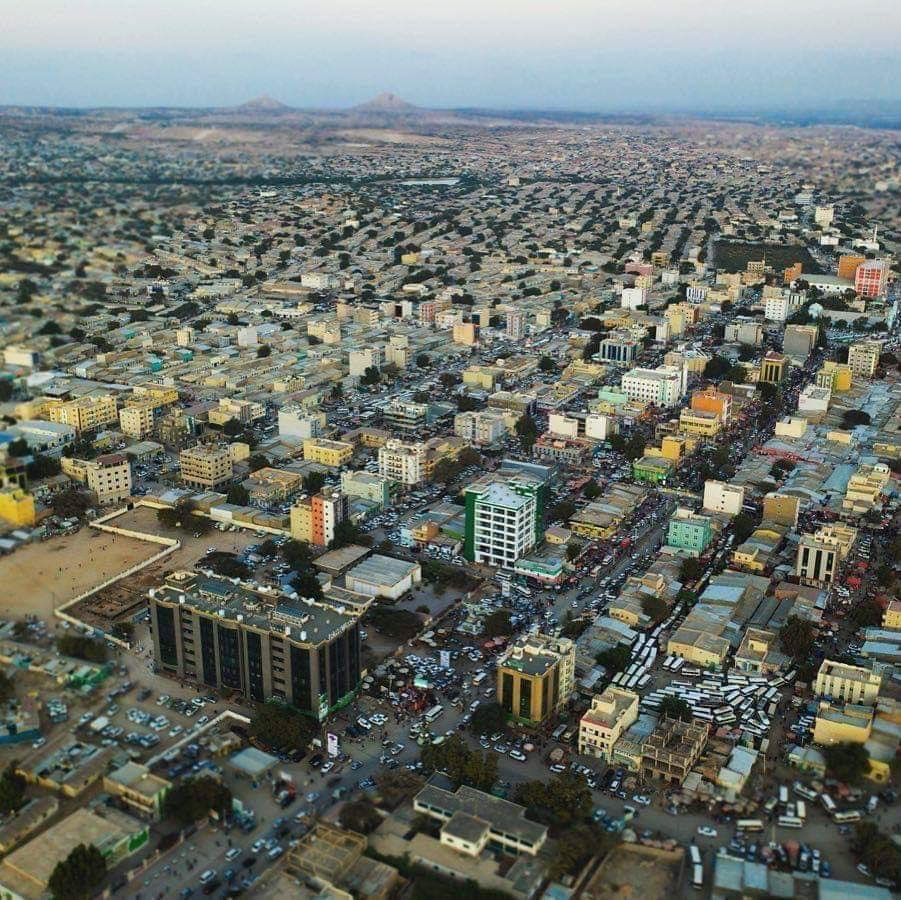
- Naasa Hablood mountains in the outskirts of Hargeisa

- Location in Somaliland
- Coordinates: 6°6′47″N 47°59′17″E
- Country: Somaliland
- Administrative centre: Hargeisa

Government
  - Governor: Mohammed Ahmed Alin

Area
  - Total: 17,429 km^{2} (6,729 sq mi)

Population (2020)
  - Total: 2,100,000
- Time zone: UTC+3 (EAT)
- HDI (2024): 0.457 low · 1st of 6

Marodi Jeh (Somali: Maroodi Jeex, Arabic: مرودي جيح), formerly known as Woqooyi Galbeed (lit. North West), is an administrative region (gobol) in western Somaliland. It is the most populous region of the country. It is bordered by Awdal to the west, Sahil to the north, Togdheer to the east to the south. Marodi Jeh was created by splitting the previously existing region (gobolka).

Cities, towns and villages in Marodi Jeh

== Etymology ==
The Marodi Jeh region (meaning "split elephant" in Somali) corresponds with the historical name of the Tog Maroodi Jeex, a seasonal river that flows through the region during the rainy season:

Hargeisa is situated on the Tug Marodijeh, the banks of which are well wooded, and as it can boast of an excellent climate all the year round, and is about half-way on the main route from Bulhar to Jig-jigga on the Abyssinian frontier, it is always likely to be of some importance to caravans. A large percentage of the trade from Ogadayn passes through it to Bulhar on the coast.

Before 2007 Maroodi Jeex was named Woqooyi Galbeed, a name which some international organisations like OCHA and FAO still use.

== History ==
Formerly known as the Hargeisa District, it was one of six districts that made up the British Somaliland protectorate. In 1960, the then independent State of Somaliland merged with Italian Somaliland to form the Somali Republic. By 1964, the then Hargeisa District merged with the Borama district (now Awdal) and the Berbera district (now Sahil) to form the Woqooyi Galbeed region (literally North West, also known as Hargeisa region).

Borama district (now Awdal) was carved out of the western parts of Woqooyi Galbeed region in June 1984. When the Somali Civil War broke out, the former British territory declared the revival of the pre-independent State of Somaliland. In 1991 Berbera district (now Sahil) was carved out of the northern parts of Woqooyi Galbeed region.

In 2007 the region of Woqooyi Galbeed was renamed to Maroodi Jeh.

== Overview ==
Marodi Jeh is bordered by Ethiopia to the south, the region of Awdal to the west, and Togdheer to the east. Its capital is Hargeisa. It is known to be a very strategic region with rich farmlands and large ports. It also contains the town of Toon, the traditional seat of the Isaaq Sultanate.

== Demographics ==
According to the Somaliland Ministry of National Planning, Marodi Jeh had a population of 2.1 million in 2020.

Marodi Jeh is inhabited by people from the Somali ethnic group, with the Arap, Ayub, Habr Garhajis, Habr Awal clans of the wider Isaaq clan-family.

== Districts ==
Under the 2002 law, the Marodi Jeh region was divided into four major and six minor districts.

1. Hargeisa District (A)
2. Gabiley District (B)
3. Salahlay District (B)
4. Baligubadle District (B)
5. Toon District (B)
6. Bali Mataan (C)
7. Faraweyne District (D)
8. Sabawanaag District (D)
9. Adadley District (D)
10. Daarasalaam District (D)
11. Allaybaday District (D)
12. Daar Buduq District (D)
13. Qoolcaday (D)

Under the 2019 law, the Marodi Jeh region was divided into four major and six minor districts.

1. Hargeisa District (A)
2. Gabiley District (A)
3. Baligubadle District (C)
4. Salahlay District (C)
5. Faraweyne District (D)
6. Sabawanaag District (D)
7. Adadley District (D)
8. Daarasalaam District (D)
9. Allaybaday District (D)
10. Bali-Matan District (D)
11. Laas Geel District (D)
12. Wajaale District (D)
13. Agabar District (D)
14. Ged-Baladh District (D)
15. Arabsiyo (D)
16. Dacarta District (D)
17. Gumburaha District (D)
18. Saylab-barri District (D)
19. Bali-cabane District (D)

== Map ==
Map of Maroodi Jeh Region

== See also ==
- Administrative divisions of Somaliland
- Regions of Somaliland
- Districts of Somaliland
- Somalia–Somaliland border
