= List of journalists killed during the Somali Civil War =

Important cities in the Somali Civil War where journalists have been killed.

This is a list of journalists killed during the Somali Civil War, which began in 1988 and is ongoing.

== Overview ==
According to the Committee to Protect Journalists (CPJ), an estimated 59 radio, print and television reporters operating within Somalia died in the period from the start of the civil war in 1992 to 2013. The CPJ estimated that the majority were locally based (73%), male (96%), broadcast journalists (45%), worked on the radio (65%), and were non-freelance (82%). Most were assassinated (65%), while covering primarily war (49%) and political stories (55%). A number also received threats prior to their deaths (22%). The sources of fire were largely political action groups (50%), mainly al-Shabaab; the assailants' affiliations were unknown in only 22% of the cases. As a consequence, the country was described by al-Jazeera as the most dangerous place in Africa for working journalists.

Early in the conflict, European journalists like Jean-Claude Jumel of France, Dan Eldon of the United Kingdom and Hansi Krauss of Germany were among those slain. The deadliest year for foreign correspondents in general was in 1993, according to the CPJ. The last foreign journalist to be killed in Somalia was Noramfaizul Mohd Nor of Malaysia, a cameraman with Bermana TV covering a relief operation.

Prior to the capital Mogadishu's pacification by the Somali National Army in mid-2011, the independent Radio Shabelle and HornAfrik Media Inc, among other Somali media outlets, were frequently targeted by Islamic militants. Among the casualties during this most volatile 2007-2011 period was Ali Iman Sharmarke, one of the founders of HornAfrik, who was killed in his role as director on 11 August 2007.

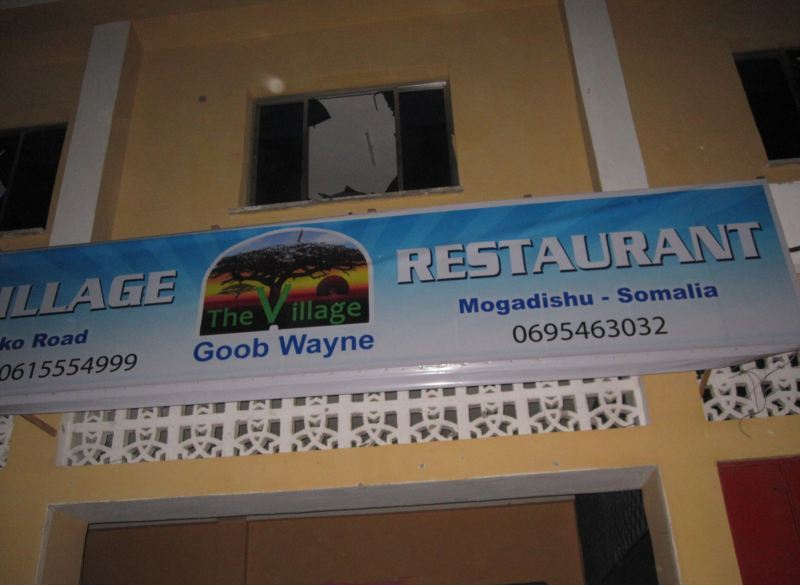
The Village restaurant in Mogadishu, a popular gathering place for working journalists, shortly after it was attacked by suicide bombers.

Since their ouster, the insurgents have resorted to issuing death threats and targeted assassinations in order to discourage reporting on their activities. Due to frustration at the increasing number of expatriate journalists returning to the capital after the relative improvement in security, the militants in 2012 intensified their anti-media campaign, killing a record 18 reporters during the year.

Jamal Osman, a journalist working for The Guardian (UK) and Channel 4, suggested in an October 2012 editorial that one of the factors behind the spate of killings of media workers in Somalia was graft amongst reporters. This was in sharp contrast to the widely held belief and CPJ data suggesting that the assassinations and death threats bore the hallmarks of the Islamist extremists. In a formal press statement, the National Union of Somali Journalists (NUSOJ) characterized Osman's editorial as "defamatory and libelous", and suggested that it represented a conscious effort to cast aspersions on the Somali media and was "an attempt to divert the public attention by aiding the real criminals, which could contribute the killing of Somali journalists to continue." The organization further indicated that "more than half of the cases took place in Mogadishu and all have been targeted in line with their profession and the majority of them have been claimed by the Shabab."

Despite the attempted intimidation, news outlets have continued to proliferate, with the number of radio and television stations in Mogadishu rising from 11 to 30 in less than five months. Journalists have also persisted in covering the war beat.

In early February 2013, the government launched an Independent Task Force on Human Rights tasked with investigating allegations of journalist intimidation and violence. Featuring a media representative, the 13-member committee is scheduled to publish a report on its findings and recommended courses of action at the end of its three-month mandate. The Task Force will eventually give way to a permanent parliamentary Human Rights Commission, which will have the capacity to investigate allegations over a longer period.

== Journalists killed ==
According to the Committee to Protect Journalists (CPJ), 73 journalists have been killed during the Somali civil war.

The last journalists killed were Mohamed Abukar Dabaashe and Ayub Wardhere on March 18, 2025.

| Date | Name | Location | Notes | Refs |
|---|---|---|---|---|
| 18 March 2025 | Mohamed Abukar Dabaashe | Ceel Gaabta, Mogadishu, Somalia | Radio Risaala reporter victim of Attempted assassination of Hassan Sheikh Mohamud | |
| 18 March 2025 | Ayub Wardhere | Ceel Gaabta, Mogadishu, Somalia | Journalist victim of Attempted assassination of Hassan Sheikh Mohamud | |
| 19 October 2024 | Amun Abdullahi | Afgooye, Lower Shabelle, Somalia | Assassinated by unidentified men believed to be loyal to al-Shabaab | |
| 13 March 2024 | Abdikarin Ahmed Bulhan | Abudwak, Galguduud, Somalia | Reporter of SNTV from Abudwak | |
| 20 November 2021 | Abdiaziz Mohamud Guled | Mogadishu, Banaadir, Somalia | Reporter of SNTV and Radio Mogadishu, Assassinated by al-Shabaab | |
| 12 July 2019 | Hodan Nalayeh -Canadian *School in Vaughan, Ontario renamed in her memory | Asasey Hotel, Kismayo, Jubaland, Somalia | Asasey Hotel attack | |
| 27 September 2016 | Abdiaziz Ali | Yaqshid district, Mogadishu, Somalia | Radio Mogadishu | |
| 5 June 2016 | Sagal Salad Osman | Hodon district, Mogadishu, Somalia | Female radio presenter for Radio Mogadishu | |
| 3 December 2015 | Hindia Haji Mohamed | Mogadishu, Somalia | Female journalist for Radio Mogadishu & Somali National TV | |
| 1 November 2015 | Mustaf Abdi Noor (aka Shafana) | Mogadishu, Somalia | Freelancer who sometimes worked through Shabelle Media Network | |
| 29 April 2015 | Daud Ali Omar | Baidoa, Somalia | Radio Baidoa | |
| 5 December 2014 | Mohamed Isaq Barre | Baidoa, Somalia | Kalsan TV | |
| 5 December 2014 | Abdulkadir Ahmed Mayow | Baidoa, Somalia | Somali Channel TV and Star FM | |
| 16 November 2014 | Abdirizak Ali Abdi (aka Silver) | Galkayo, Puntland, Somalia | Freelancer | |
| 21 June 2014 | Yusuf Ahmed Abukar | Mogadishu, Somalia | Radio Ergo and Mustaqbal Radio | |
| 26 October 2013 | Mohamed Mohamud | Mogadishu, Somalia | Universal TV | |
| 7 July 2013 | Liban Abdullahi Farah | Galkayo, Mugdug, Somalia | Journalist for Somali Broadcasting Corporation | |
| 21 April 2013 | Mohamed Ibrahim Rageh | Dharkenley district, Mogadishu, Somalia | Journalist for Radio Mogadishu and Somali National Television | |
| 14 April 2013 | Mohamed Hassan Habeeb | Mogadishu, Somalia | Journalist acting as a media adviser in a court case | |
| 24 March 2013 | Rahmo Abdulqadir (a.k.a., Rahma Abdulkadir) | Mogadishu, Somalia | Journalist, Radio Abduwaq (Galgaduud region) | |
| 18 March 2013 | Mohamed Ali Nuxurkey | Mogadishu, Somalia | Journalist, Radio Mustaqbal | |
| 18 January 2013 | Abdihared Osman Aden | Mogadishu, Somalia | Producer and journalist, Radio Shabelle | |
| 29 October 2012 | Warsame Shire Awale | Mogadishu, Somalia | Radio Kulmiye | |
| 29 October 2012 | Mohamed Mohamud Turyare | Mogadishu, Somalia | Reporter, Radio Shabelle | |
| 23 October 2012 | Ahmed Farah Ilyas | Las Anod, Somalia | Broadcast reporter, Universal TV | |
| 28 September 2012 | Ahmed Abdullahi Farah | Dharkenley district, Mogadishu, Somalia | Journalist representing Yemeni news agency | |
| 27 September 2012 | Abdirahman Mohamed Ali | Suuqa Holaha Market, Huriwa district, Mogadishu, Somalia | Online sports writer for ciyaarahamaanta.com | |
| 21 September 2012 | Hassan Yusuf Absuge | Yaqshid, Mogadishu, Somalia | Reporter and producer, Radio Maanta | |
| 20 September 2012 | Liban Ali Nur | Mogadishu, Somalia | Head of News, Somali National TV | |
| 20 September 2012 | Abdisatar Daher Sabriye | Mogadishu, Somalia | Head of News, Radio Mogadishu and the former chair for the Somali Exiled Journalists Association (SEJASS) | |
| 20 September 2012 | Abdirahman Yasin Ali | Mogadishu, Somalia | Director, Radio Hamar | |
| 16 September 2012 | Zakariye Mohamed Mohamud Moallim | Nasib Bundo, Mogadishu, Somalia | Camera operator | |
| 12 August 2012 | Yusuf Ali Osman (a.k.a. Farey) | Dharkenley district, Mogadishu, Somalia | Former director of Radio Mogadishu | |
| 12 August 2012 | Mohamud Ali Keyre (a.k.a. Buneyste) | Mogadishu, Somalia | Freelance journalist for Horyaalmedia.com | |
| 31 July 2012 | Abdi Jaylani Malaq (a.k.a. Marshale) | Mogadishu, Somalia | Producer, Universal TV | |
| 24 May 2012 | Ahmed Addow Anshur | Dharkenley district, Mogadishu, Somalia | Shabelle Media Network | |
| 2 May 2012 | Farhan Jeemis Abdulle | Garsoor (near Galkayo), Mudug, Somalia | Radio Daljir, Galkayo | |
| 5 April 2012 | Mahad Salad Adan (a.k.a. Mahad Jamal) | Beledweyne, Hinan, Somalia | Shabelle Media Network | |
| 4 March 2012 | Ali Ahmed Abdi | Galkayo, Somalia | Radio Galkayo | |
| 28 February 2012 | Abukar Hassan Mohamoud (a.k.a. Kadaf) | Mogadishu, Somalia | Director, Radio Somaliweyn | |
| 28 January 2012 | Hassan Osman Abdi (a.k.a. Hassan Fantastic) | Mogadishu, Somalia | Director, Shabelle Media Network | |
| 18 December 2011 | Abdisalan Sheik Hassan | Somalia | Horn Cable TV | |
| 2 September 2011 | Noramfaizul Mohd Nor (Malaysian) | Mogadishu, Somalia | Bernama TV | |
| 31 August 2010 | Abdullahi Omar Gedi | Galkayo district, Puntland, Somalia | Radio Daljir | |
| 24 August 2010 | Barkhad Awale Adan | Somalia | Director, Hurma Radio | |
| 4 May 2010 | Sheik Nur Mohamed Abkey | Mogadishu, Somalia | Radio Mogadishu | |
| 3 December 2009 | Mohamed Amin Adan Abdulle | Mogadishu, Somalia | Radio Shabelle journalist murdered in the 2009 Hotel Shamo bombing | |
| 3 December 2009 | Hassan Zubeyr Haji Hassan | Mogadishu, Somalia | Camera operator, al-Arabia TV, murdered in the 2009 Hotel Shamo bombing | |
| 3 December 2009 | Yasir Mairo | Mogadishu, Somalia | Freelance photographer murdered in the 2009 Hotel Shamo bombing | |
| 7 June 2009 | Muktar Mohamed Hirabe | Mogadishu, Somalia | Director, Radio Shabelle | |
| 25 May 2009 | Nur Muse Hussein | Somalia | Voice of the Holy Quran radio | |
| 22 May 2009 | Abdirisak Warsameh Mohamed | Somalia | Radio Shabelle | |
| 4 February 2009 | Said Tahlil Ahmed | Somalia | Director, Horn Afrik Radio/TV | |
| 1 January 2009 | Hassan Mayow Hassan | Afgooye, Somalia | Radio Shabelle | |
| 7 June 2008 | Nasteh Dahir Farah | Somalia | A BBC and Associated Press reporter who was also the Vice President of the National Union of Somali Journalists | |
| 28 January 2008 | Hassan Kafi Hared | Somalia | Somali National News Agency | |
| 19 October 2007 | Bashir Nur Gedi | Somalia | Chief executive, Shabelle Media network | |
| 24 August 2007 | Abdulkadir Mahad Moallim Kaskey | Somalia | Radio Banadir | |
| 11 August 2007 | Mahad Ahmed Elmi | Somalia | Director, Radio Capital Voice | |
| 11 August 2007 | Ali Iman Sharmarke | Somalia | Managing Director, HornAfrik Radio | |
| 16 May 2007 | Ahmed Hassan Mahad | Middle Shabelle province, Somalia | Radio Jowhar | |
| 16 May 2007 | Abshir Ali Gabre | Middle Shabelle province, Somalia | Editor, Radio Jowhar | |
| 5 May 2007 | Mohammed Abdullahi Khalif | Somalia | Voice (radio) | |
| 16 February 2007 | Ali Mohammed Omar | Baidoa, Somalia | Radio Warsan | |
| 23 June 2006 | Martin Adler (Swedish) | Mogadishu, Somalia | Aftonbladet | |
| 5 June 2005 | Duniya Muhiyadin Nur | Afgooye, Somalia | Capital Voice of HornAfrik | |
| 9 February 2005 | Kate Peyton (British) | Mogadishu, Somalia | Journalist for the BBC's Johannesburg bureau | |
| 24 January 2003 | Abdullahi Madkeer | Baidoa, Somalia | Covering the airport reopening for DMC Radio. | |
| 26 January 2000 | Ahmed Kafi Awale | Bakara market, Mogadishu, Somalia | Radio of the Somali People | |
| 9 February 1995 | Marcello Palmisano (Italian) | Mogadishu, Somalia | Shot while traveling on airport road while working for RAI. | |
| 31 August 1994 | Pierre Anceaux (Swiss) | Baidoa, Somalia | Reporting on a charity-run refugee camp. | |
| 20 March 1994 | Ilaria Alpi (Italian) | Mogadishu, Somalia | Reporting for RAI-3 on illegal toxic waste. | |
| 20 March 1994 | Miran Hrovatin (Italian) | Mogadishu, Somalia | Reporting for RAI-3 on illegal toxic waste. | |
| 12 July 1993 | Dan Eldon (British) | Mogadishu, Somalia | Died while covering a US operation before the Battle of Mogadishu (1993). Eldon, Macharia, and Maina were working for Reuters as a journalist, sound producer, and photographer. Another Reuters cameraman, Mohammed Shaffi, survived. Krauss was working for the Associated Press. | |
| 12 July 1993 | Anthony Macharia (Kenyan) | Mogadishu, Somalia | Died while covering a US operation before the Battle of Mogadishu (1993). Eldon, Macharia, and Maina were working for Reuters as a journalist, sound producer, and photographer. Another Reuters cameraman, Mohammed Shaffi, survived. Krauss was working for the Associated Press. | |
| 12 July 1993 | Hos Maina (Kenyan) | Mogadishu, Somalia | Died while covering a US operation before the Battle of Mogadishu (1993). Eldon, Macharia, and Maina were working for Reuters as a journalist, sound producer, and photographer. Another Reuters cameraman, Mohammed Shaffi, survived. Krauss was working for the Associated Press. | |
| 12 July 1993 | Hansi Krauss (German) | Mogadishu, Somalia | Died while covering a US operation before the Battle of Mogadishu (1993). Eldon, Macharia, and Maina were working for Reuters as a journalist, sound producer, and photographer. Another Reuters cameraman, Mohammed Shaffi, survived. Krauss was working for the Associated Press. | |
| 18 June 1993 | Jean-Claude Jumel (French) | Mogadishu, Somalia | He was shot by a sniper while traveling with his TF1 news crew, for which he worked on sound, from the airport. | |

== See also ==
- Media of Somalia
- Somali Civil War
