= Ali Iman Sharmarke =

Somalian and Canadian journalist, philanthropist

- علي ايمان شرماركي
- Born: 1956 or 1957
- Died: August 11, 2007 (aged 50); Mogadishu, Somalia
- Education: Carleton University, George Mason University
- Occupations: Journalist, civil servant, philanthropist
- Employer: HornAfrik Media Inc
- Title: Managing Director of HornAfrik Radio
- Spouse: Luul Mohamed
- Children: 3
- Awards: International Press Freedom Award; Tara Singh Hayer Award

Ali Iman Sharmarke (Somali: Cali Imaan Sharmaarke, Arabic: علي ايمان شرماركي) (b. 1956/1957-d. 11 August 2007) was a Somalian and Canadian journalist and philanthropist. He was a co-founder of HornAfrik Media Inc, the first independent radio network to have its headquarters in Mogadishu, Somalia. In 2007, he was killed by a roadside bomb. Sharmarke was posthumously awarded the CJFE's International Press Freedom Award and Tara Singh Hayer Award for his journalistic work. His family also established the Sharmarke Peace Foundation in his memory.

== Personal life ==
Sharmarke was raised in Somalia. After the start of the civil war in the early 1990s, he emigrated to Canada. He subsequently became a Canadian citizen, holding dual citizenship.

While living in Ottawa, Sharmarke completed a Master's in Public Administration at Carleton University. He also studied political science and economics going on to earn a PhD from the same institution.

Sharmarke was married to Luul Mohamed, with whom he had three children, Liban, Hanad, and Nora.

== Career ==
=== Finance Department ===
Sharmarke initially worked at the Department of Finance Canada in Ottawa. Although he had no previous background in journalism, he set out to establish a new radio network in Somalia so as to facilitate access to information and to give local residents an outlet to express their views.

=== HornAfrik ===
In early 1999, Sharmarke and fellow Somali emigrants to Canada Ahmed Abdisalam Adan and Mohamed Elmi returned to Mogadishu following a period of relative calm in order to finalize market research that they had conducted on the feasibility and technological equipment necessary to start a new media company in the city. Concluding that the project was workable, the independent HornAfrik broadcast firm was subsequently officially launched on 12 December 1999.

Under Sharmarke's direction, HornAfrik earned a reputation for its objective news coverage. It ran a number of popular call-in programs, which allowed residents of Mogadishu and the surrounding area to share their views on various issues of local interest, including topics related to culture, health, religion, peace, education and economy. In the past, the network also used to air interviews with faction leaders who at the time controlled parts of the city.

Due to its transmissions of international segments, the network earned criticism from religious fundamentalists, with the Al-Shabaab militant group routinely launching attacks against the company and its staff. In 2007, the former Transitional Federal Government (TFG) also shut down HornAfrik's radio and television stations on charges that it was abetting terrorist groups by airing programs which allegedly supported extremist elements. Sharmarke rejected the allegations, characterizing them as a denial of press freedom.

Additionally, HornAfrik engaged in some philanthropic work.

== Death ==
On 11 August 2007, Sharmarke's co-worker at HornAfrik's Capital Voice private radio station, Mahad Ahmed Elmi, who ran a popular daily morning call-in show on crime and security operations, was gunned down by unknown assailants as he entered his office in the early morning. On his way back from his friend's funeral service later the same day, Sharmarke's vehicle was struck by a remotely controlled landmine. He was killed in the explosion, with fellow passenger and journalist Sahal Abdulle lightly wounded on the head and face.

A few hours before his death, Sharmarke had told Reuters that "perpetrators want to silence our voices in order to commit their crimes." His slaying sparked outrage among his colleagues in the reporting community. The National Union of Somali Journalists (NUSOJ) suggested in a statement that "this wave of killing and injuring media people [was] an intentionally organised mission to silence journalistic voices in Somalia." However, the union did not lay blame on any specific group or individual, nor did any other party. Two men were later arrested for the homicides.

== Sharmarke Peace Foundation ==
In August 2009, Sharmarke's widow Luul and their son Liban, an Ottawa-based businessman, established the Sharmarke Peace Foundation in his honor. The organization provides training and equipment to expatriate Somalian journalists so that they may return to their home country and continue their work. It also offers various self-sustaining projects and scholarship opportunities to young journalists in Somalia, with the aim of strengthening local media standards.

== Awards ==
In 2002, Sharmarke and the other co-founders of HornAfrik were honored as the winners of the Canadian Journalists for Free Expression (CJFE's) International Press Freedom Award. HornAfrik was presented the award for its work in the face of threats and intimidation at a time when there was no effective legal recourse or protection for the local press.

In 2007, Sharmarke was also posthumously awarded the Tara Singh Hayer Award by the CJFE for his courage in the field of journalism. His son Liban accepted the prize on his behalf.

== See also ==
- Attacks on HornAfrik Media Inc
- List of journalists killed during the Somali civil war
