= Sheikh Nur Mohamed Abkey =

Somalian journalist (c.1958–2010)

- Born: Sheikh Nur Mohamed Abkey; 1958
- Died: May 4, 2010 (aged 51-52); Mogadishu, Somalia
- Cause of death: Gunshot wound
- Occupation: Journalist
- Family: Wife and four children

Sheikh Nur Mohamed Abkey (ca.1958 – 4 May 2010) was a Somali journalist killed in the line of duty. Abkey worked for Radio Mogadishu-Voice of Somali Republic in Somalia's capital city. He had a long career as a journalist and worked under difficult conditions during the last two decades of his career.

== Career ==
Abkey was a well-known journalist in Somalia who had been working for media concerns since at least 1988 or possibly 1970. He had worked for East Africa Radio, SONA (the Somali News Agency), the radio station HornAfrik and for the Somali Television Network as a comedian and news anchor before going to work for Radio Mogadishu where he trained journalists with the country's Information Ministry. Associates said he turned down suggestions that for security he should live at the radio station and that he refused to be intimidated by the factions fighting in Mogadishu.

== Death ==
He was abducted by armed hooded men early on the morning of 4 May and then later that day shot to death near his home in the Wardhigley neighbourhood of the capital. The editor of Radio Mogadishu, Abdirahman Yusuf, was quoted as saying, "Al Shabaab men have killed Sheikh Nur Abkey ... after they killed him, they called us and told us they killed him." Abdolaziz Mohamed Guled, Radio Magadishu's political correspondent said that Abkey was tortured before he was killed by his kidnappers and eyewitnesses stated that Abkey's body was dumped on a Mogadishu street.

It is believed that Abkey was killed because he was an employee of the government-run Radio Mogadishu, which had been against the extreme insurgents.

== Reaction ==
Almost immediately, the International Press Institute condemned Abkey's murder. and in July 2010, Amnesty International condemned the killing of journalists and called for both the government forces and the armed militias to respect freedom of expression.

The Secretary-General of the National Union of Somali Journalists, a partner-organization with Reporters Without Borders, said, "Somali journalists are being murdered just for reporting their stories independently or because they work for a particular news media. The loss of this experienced journalist is heartbreaking for his family and colleagues, but it is also a blow to the entire Somali people."

Irina Bokova, the director-general of UNESCO, said, "I condemn the murder of Sheikh Nur Abkey. His brutal killing is a heinous crime against a brave journalist and against Somali society as a whole. Nothing good will come to the people of Somalia from those seeking to deprive citizens of the right to know and journalists of the basic human right of freedom of expression..."

== See also ==
- List of journalists killed during the Somali civil war
- Somali Civil War (2009–present)
