= Attacks on HornAfrik =

Attacks on media organization in Somalia

Mogadishu, the headquarters of HornAfrik Media Inc

HornAfrik, a (now-defunct) news organization based in Mogadishu, was subjected to various attacks by militants during the Islamist insurgency (2006–2009) in southern Somalia. Prior to the company's closure in 2010, these incidents included:

== Attacks on HornAfrik ==
=== 2005 ===
==== January ====
HornAfrik offices were attacked when two men threw two grenades at the radio station's building. No one ever claimed responsibility for the attack but co-founder Ahmed Abdisalam Adan claimed that they had been condemned as "anti-Islamic" and were said to be serving "foreign interests" by Islamist extremist groups during prayer in the days prior.

==== May ====
Nurdin Ahmed, a veteran reporter at HornAfrik is wounded in Mogadishu when a shooter fired upon him three times at close range. Ahmed recovered and officials at HornAfrik's offices told the Committee to Protect Journalists that it was unclear why Ahmed was targeted. He also owns a snack bar so his attack could have been business or journalism related.

==== June ====
Radio journalist Duniya Muhyadin Nur is shot and killed while covering a protest in Afgoye. Nur, who worked for Capital Voice (owned by HornAfrik) was at a driver's blockade where people were protesting the proliferation of militia roadblocks, when someone opened fire and a bullet came through her taxi window, killing her instantly.

==== August ====
After reporting that officials had taken over a school building for their operations and displaced some 1500 students in doing so, Abdullahi Kulmiya Adow of HornAfrik is imprisoned and harassed. After being detained for five days, Adow was eventually released without charge. However, he was transported out of Jowhar via armed guard and expelled from the town.

=== 2006 ===
==== September ====
HornAfrik's Mogadishu station is shut down by Islamist militia. Sheik Adan Ismail, Adan Mohamed Salad and Sahro Abdi Ahmed (all HornAfrik employees) are all detained and arrested after being accused of broadcasting stories that were critical of the militia's organization. The Associated Press quoted the Islamic Court's spokesman Sheik Ibrahim Mohamed as saying "We have arrested them for conveying wrong messages to the people that are against Islamic court". The National Union of Somali Journalists condemned the arrest and called upon the Islamic Courts Council to end the violation immediately. Their plea was responded to by Sheik Ahdirahim Ali Mudey, head of the Islamic Courts Information Office. He stated that the reports could be convicted under Islamic law if their reports were found to be inaccurate.

=== 2007 ===
==== August ====
Director of Capital Voice, Mahad Ahmed Elmi is shot in the head 4 times from a close range as he entered his office. Elmi hosted one of Somalia's most popular call-in radio shows. Ali Iman Sharmarke, co-founder of HornAfrik as well as friend and colleague to Elmi, told the Associated Press that "the killing was meant to prevent a real voice that described the suffering in Mogudishu to other Somalis and to the world" he also called the murder a part of "a campaign to silence journalists". After speaking at Elmi's funeral a few days later, Ali Sharmarke was leaving in the funeral procession when a remotely detonated land mine hit his vehicle. According to reports, the bomb hit on Sharmarke's side of the car and no other cars were hit. It came as a surprise to some when the day after the assassination, mayor of Mogadishu Omar Habeeb Dheere announced that two men had been arrested for the murders of Sharmarke and Elmi. He was quoted on the matter saying "Government troops last night arrested two men in Yaqshid, one of whom confessed to being involved in both attacks. We condemn the killings of Ali Iman Sharmarke and of journalists. I urge the media not to be intimidated by such terrorist acts." Partners and friends of Sharmarke were glad to hear of the arrests, however, they had their doubts and admitted to needing further proof before they believed that justice was being served. Sharmarke's death sparked outrage from the UN and the CJFE, both making public statements calling for action in an effort to ensure safety and freedom of the media.

After the two murders, militants made death threats against three more reporters at HornAfrik if the station did not shut down its operations.

=== 2008 ===
==== December ====
HornAfrik is forced off the air when 10 armed militiamen conducted a raid at the station in Kismayo. The militants were part of the Islamic insurgent group Al-Shabaab that controls the Somali town. The militia presented director Ahmed Mohamed Aden with an order signed by the Information Secretary of the Islamic administration, Sheikh Hassan Yaqub Ali, accusing the station of airing music and "anit-Islmaist" information. The Committee to Protect Journalists called on Secretary Ali to reverse his decision and allow HornAfrik, Kismayo's only radio station, back on the air. 29 October 3 journalist wounded suicide bomb abdirisaq hamud cayduud camera man heegan media group reporter jamal abdi ahmed and Somaliland space channel producer and reporter Mohamed harun ahmed

=== 2009 ===
==== February ====
Said Tahlil Ahmed, director of HornAfrik since 2007, is shot and killed in Mogadishu's Bakara market. Ahmed and fellow journalists were walking through the market on their way to a press conference called by hardline Islamic militia group Al-Shabaab. It is not uncommon for the market to be the battleground for government soldiers and Islamist insurgents. Masked men entered the alley that Ahmed and fellow journalists were in and opened fire, shooting Ahmed several times and killing him on the spot. As the men continued to shoot, the others ran for safety and were able to remain unharmed. Although Al-Shabaab invited the journalist to the event, they firmly denied being responsible for the killings.

Just days before Said Ahmed's murder, Sheikh Sharif Ahmed was elected as the new President of the Transitional Federal Government. Locals hoped the election of this moderate Islamist leader would bring peace to southern Somalia. The National Union of Somali Journalists said Ahmed was killed for his commitment to independent journalism and called the assassination "outrageous and appalling". They asked President Ahmed to stop these killings and act swiftly to stop the targeted violence against journalists.

==== December ====
Long time broadcaster and reporter, Hassan Mohamed, is shot in the hand and back as he leaves HornAfrik offices. The attack came moments after Mohamed refused to air messages from religious figures with ties to Al-Shabaab. Mohamed survived and recovered from the attack.

=== 2010 ===
==== September ====
Al-Shabaab Islamic militants raid and loot HornAfrik's office in Mogadishu. They chased away the journalists and damages range from broken cassettes and CDs to removing all the stations transmitters, computers and equipment. After the militiamen seized the station, insisting they "must serve Islam", they said they would now only broadcast Islamic messages. Reporter Hassan Mohamed began to receive disturbing death threats when rumors circulated that HornAfrik would be coming back on the air after the attack. These death threats lead to Mohamed's eventual exile to Nairobi.
