= Abukar =

Abukar is both a given name and a surname. Notable people with the name include:

- Abukar Arman, Somali political analyst and diplomat
- Abukar Hassan Mohamoud (died 2012), Somalian activist
- Abukar Umar Adani, Somali politician
- Fartun Abukar Omar (born 1986), Somali sprinter
- Leila Abukar (born 1974/75), Somali-born Australian activist
- Safia Abukar Hussein (born 1981), Somali sprinter
