= National Theatre of Somalia =

Theatre in Mogadishu, Somalia

Coordinates: 2.0373505°N 45.3374568°E

- The National Theatre of Somalia in 2023
- Interactive map of National Theatre of Somalia
- Address: Mogadishu; Somalia
- Owner: Federal Government of Somalia
- Type: National theatre

Construction
- Opened: 1967

The National Theatre of Somalia is located in central Mogadishu, Somalia. It opened in 1967, and served as an important cultural landmark in the national capital. The institution closed down after the start of the civil war in the early 1990s, but was later intermittently renovated by the local authorities. In 2013, the Somali and Chinese governments signed an official cooperation agreement as part of a five-year national recovery plan in Somalia that will see the Chinese authorities reconstruct several major infrastructural landmarks in Mogadishu and elsewhere, including the National Theatre.

== History ==
The building of the National Theatre of Somalia was built by Chinese engineers as a present from Mao Zedong in the 1960s. The building was finished and opened in 1967.

After Siad Barre came to power the National Theatre became an important institution within the socialist vision of a new Somalia. Siad Barre claimed that he wanted to overcome the clan-based society of Somalia. Therefore, people from all the different clans have worked in the National Theatre and have developed its unique aesthetic.

The National Theatre didn't have a single ensemble, but several bands were working and performing there. In the Somali theatre tradition music and theatrical representation are closely linked, therefore theatre companies are usually referred to as "bands". The most famous of these were the Waaberi which evolved from the combination of the band of Radio Mogadishu and General Daud band that belonged to the military forces and was named after Daud Abdulle Hirsi. Waaberi included such well known artists as Ali Feiruz, Abdullahi Qarshe, Magool, Maryam Mursal, Hassan Sheikh Mumin and Abdi Ali (Bacalwaan) List of Somalis. Other bands that performed in the National Theatre or that were part of it are: Horseed (the band existed already before the independence under the name Ex-bana Estro), Halgan, Onkod, and Iftin and shanti shareero. All the bands belonged to an institution of the state, for example, the Iftin band belonged to the Ministry of Education and was therefore also in charge of the musical education of school teachers.

When the civil war broke out in July 1991, the National Theatre was amongst the first buildings to be destroyed. In the first months of the war there was even a show in the destroyed building that was called "You Destroyed the Roof, So Don't Look Up". Later through the war the theatre did not work at all. The ruins subsequently served as a stock for weapons and as an unofficial public toilet.

In the fall of 2011 Jabril Ibrahim Abdulle, director of the Centre for Research and Dialogue Somalia started to gather former artists from the National Theatre in order to plan the reanimation of the theatre. After provisionally reconditioning the building a reopening ceremony was held on 19 March 2012. The ceremony was broadcast on national TV and about 1000 spectators came to see the ceremony that included a play that was written by former members of the different bands: Dardaarwin Walid (Parents' advice). Some weeks later on 4 April a suicide attack hit the celebration of the anniversary of the national TV that was held in the theatre building and killed 10 people. Al-Shabaab claimed responsibility for the attack. As of 2013 the renovations of the building are going on and Abdiduh Yusuf Hassan the current director of the theatre launched a program called Hirgeli Hamigaaga Faneed (Awaken your inner artist) that is basically a kind of Somali Idol – a talent show. Within these activities he supported a reopening celebration of the National Theatre of Somalia in Exile in Vienna in 2013. Abdiduh Yusuf Hassan hopes to revive the Somali performing arts through this program.

In September 2013, the Somali and Chinese foreign ministries signed an official cooperation agreement in Mogadishu as part of a five-year national recovery plan in Somalia. The pact will see the Chinese authorities reconstruct several major infrastructural landmarks in the Somali capital and elsewhere, including the National Theatre, a hospital, and the Mogadishu Stadium.

== Aesthetic ==
The National Theatre of Somalia had a clear task within the socialist vision of a future Somalia in a future world. The artists took that mission very seriously and developed a concise program independently from the official policies. While the actual policies of the Siad Barre regime contradicted its own aims more and more, the National Theatre of Somalia implemented an aesthetic of radical equality that is still incomparable.

This aesthetic was developed along principles that were derived from scientific socialism. They shall be summarised in the following.

- In the socialist perspective everybody counts the same or nobody can be said to count anything.
- Equality in rationality does not prevail. Thus it can not be the basis of our protest against a policy of discrimination between the ruling and the ruled, between us and those that do not belong to us. Political equality will not follow from any properties of people. Equality is not a matter of facts but something we must presuppose. Equality always means equality of potentiality.
- The primary emancipation is the emancipation from our social being: from our clan affiliation, from our social status from everything that emerges from our different capabilities. It is the emancipation from our inequalities.
- Any capability must result from a potentiality. Capabilities enable us to assume certain social roles, we acquire them by practice. Capabilities are oriented towards success. But potentiality has no measures and no ends. The function of potentiality is a play, something that is always beyond its own limits.
- All humans are equal because they have the potentiality to change. They can change their seeing their feelings and their imagination.
- Equality as potentiality is nothing that simply exists, but something that we experience in certain actions. These are aesthetic actions, actions of play and imagination, actions of doing something that we cannot do.
- Political equality is a result of aesthetical practice.

In this way the National Theatre of Somalia conceptualised itself as a central force in the development of a new society. The work of the National Theatre has not been documented very extensively. This together with the effects of the civil war yields the unfortunate situation that it is not known in detail, how one of the most important theatrical aesthetics of the 20th century looked like. However some facts are clear. The combination of music and songs with dramatic dialogue and action was central to the theatrical form. Many plays were partly written in verses, while other parts were prose. The prose parts were typically open to improvisation. Actors would just get the basic outline of such scenes and would then improvise within this given frame.

The National Theatre succeeded in reaching an audience that was not limited by social conventions:

The audiences who frequent the theatre are not limited to any particular social group; the theatre attracts huge crowds of people, both men and women, and among them one can find members of the new educated elite just as easily as persons who have had no formal education. Plays are performed not only at the National Theatre in Mogadishu, but also in provincial centres, where the spectators include pastoralists and farmers from the surrounding areas.

== Renovations ==
In September 2013, the Somali Federal Government and its Chinese counterpart signed an official cooperation agreement in Mogadishu as part of a five-year national recovery plan in Somalia. The pact will see the Chinese authorities reconstruct the National Theatre of Somalia in addition to several other major infrastructural landmarks.

== See also ==
- Ethiopian National Theatre
