= Ayr (clan) =

Languages
- English language

Religion
- Islam

Related ethnic groups
- Saruur, Sacad, Duduble, sheekhaal and other Hawiye groupsSaruur, Sacad, Saleban and Duduble

Ayr (Somali: Cayr or Ceyr) is a Somali clan that is part of the larger Habar Gidir Hawiye clan. The Ayr clan is the eldest Habargidir sub-clan and is the largest Habargidir sub-clan in population. The Ayr clan have a rich history in Somali society and has played an important role in shaping Somali history and national politics. Members of the clan reside in 6 out of the total 18 regions of Somalia but are primarily found in the central region of Somalia - Galgaduud region which they hold a monopoly over and is considered their heartlands. They are considered the most powerful sub-clan in central and southern Somalia controlling important sections of the country and greatly influencing the nation's capital Mogadishu, holding the 1st mayorship position in the post-independence era. The Ayr are regarded as being very large in numbers because they are spread throughout numerous regions in Somalia and are significant to the country's political, economic, social, and military sectors.

== Overview ==
The current Ugaas of the clan is Ugaas Hassan Ugaas Mohamed Ugaas Nuur.

== History ==
=== Medieval period ===
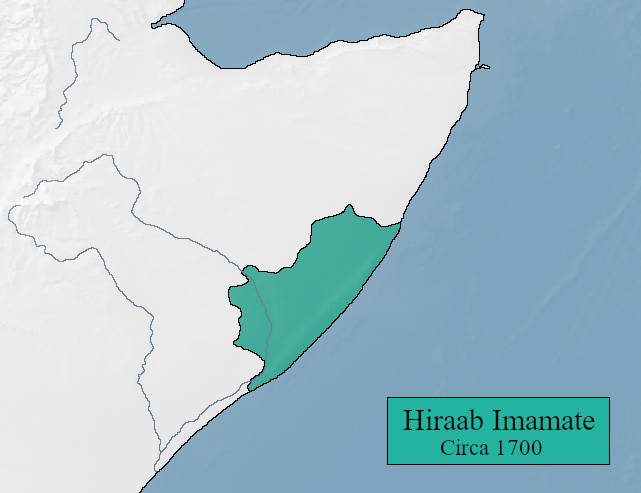
Hiraab Imamate extent of rule in the Somali peninsula.

During the medieval period, the Ayr clan, though relatively young and modest in size, was part of the Ajuran Sultanate. The Ajuran Sultanate was a formidable Muslim Somali empire that ruled over the Hawiye clan, which the Ajuran is part of, and was a dominant force in the Indian Ocean trade during the Middle Ages.

As the Ajuran Sultanate faced its decline, the Ayr clan actively engaged in both the overthrow and defence of this once-powerful empire under the united banner of the wider Habargidir and Hiraab forces who had planned to defeat the empire due to injustices. Notably, various sections of the Ayr, such as the Yabadhaale and a few segments of the Mu'le(Mucle/Tolweyne), dedicated significant military efforts to prevent the Sultanate from falling. Despite the efforts, the Ajuran empire was eventually defeated and was replaced by the Hiraab Imamate and other smaller Sultanates.

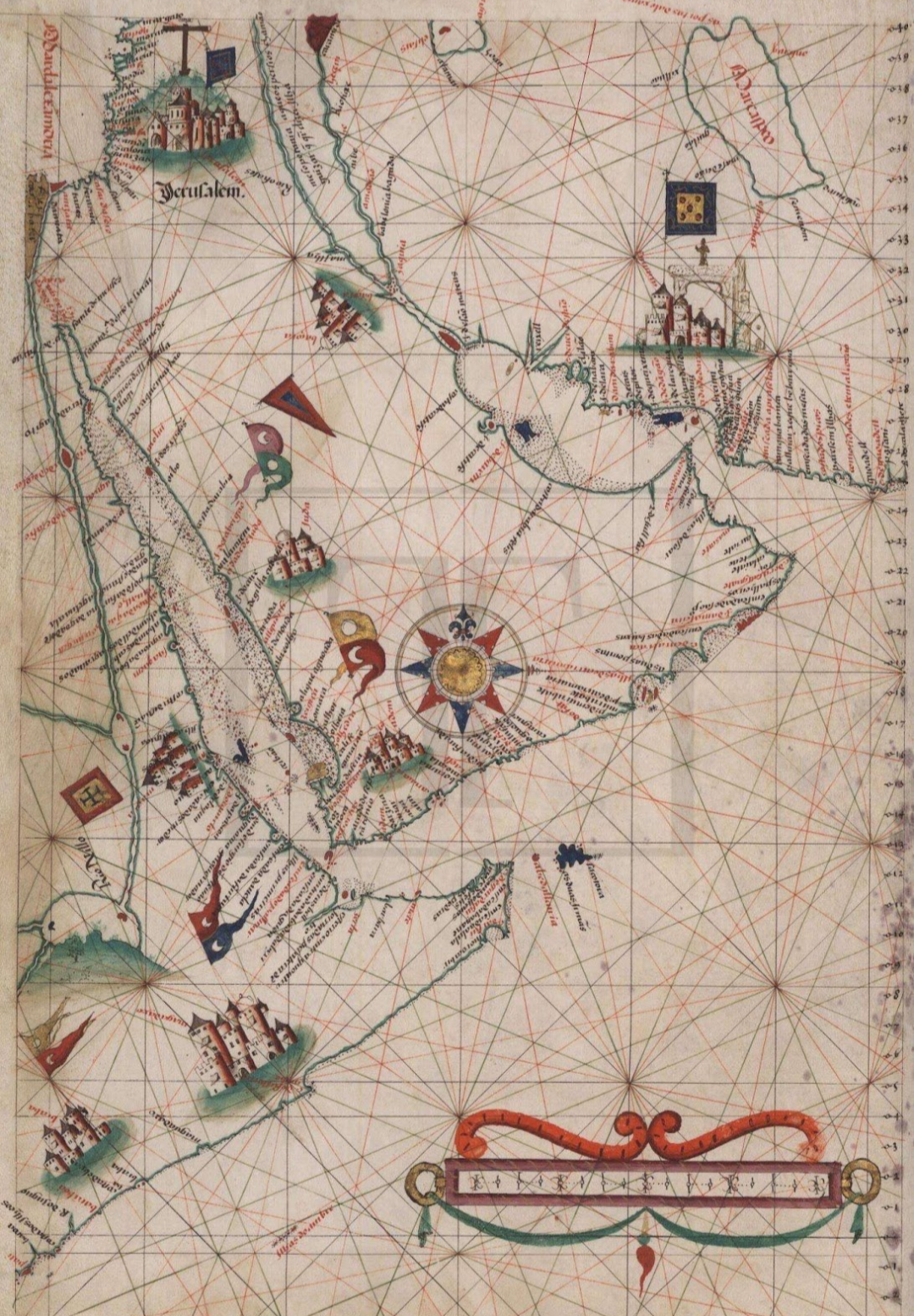
Hiraab Imamate.

=== Ayr Ugaasate ===
The inception of the Ayr Ugaas dates back approximately 400–500 years. The inaugural Ugaas, Aalin Arole, also known as Caalin Caroole, ascended to leadership as foretold by his forefather Abti-idig. The prediction foresaw the Ugaas of the Ayr clan emerging from Abti-idig's son, Dhowrakace Abti-idig, marked by a distinct brightness or sign on his body (Calaamo). According to elders, this prediction was made by Abti-idig because he understood constellations and was knowledgeable about astronomy.

Islaaleey or 'Habar Islaaleed' and Ajiyeey or 'Habar Aji' were the two wives of Abti-Idig and they bore him 4 sons in total each wife birthing 2 twin sons.

The first of the two wives, Habar Islaaleed, was a wealthy woman who had a life akin to a royal and lived relatively lavishly in comparison to her counterparts, but it was also rumoured that she harboured protective jealousy towards her husband. She owned numerous animals, a beautiful traditional Somali home, and other pricey possessions. Habar Aji, on the other hand, was a younger woman who used to assist Habar Islaaleed tend to her household chores. Despite all this wealth and luxury, Habar Islaaleed was unable to conceive when Abti-idig tried to have a child with her. His wife informed him that she would only be able to have children if he married HabarAji, the helper girl. Following the advice, Abti-Idig wed Habaraji and started trying to conceive a child with her and his first wife Habar Islaaleed.

Not long after, both Habar Aji and Habar Islaaleed became pregnant at the same time. They went into labour almost simultaneously. Aware of his first wife’s jealousy, Abti-Idig decided to separate the two women for childbirth. He led Habar-Aji to a place far from Habar Islaaleed’s location, giving her seven cows with calves and instructing her to give birth under a large tree he had prepared for her. And for Habar-Islaaleed he let her birth in her own home

While both women were in labour at dusk, Abti-Idig moved frequently between them. He first went to Habar Aji, who gave birth to her first son, whom he named Warwaaq after rain began to fall following the child’s birth. He then went to Habar Islaaleed, who had also delivered her first son. Abti-Idig named him Dhowrakace, a name chosen because he had feared she might miscarry during her pregnancy, as she had already experienced reproductive difficulties. Returning to Habar Aji, he found that she had unexpectedly given birth to a second twin son, whom he named Qoorcas (meaning “redneck” in English). When he went back to Habar Islaaleed, he discovered she too had delivered a second twin son, Daaud, who was nicknamed Sabuh because he was the last born and arrived with the start of June, the month of Sabuh.

Abti-Idig went to HabarAji, where she gave birth to Warwaaq, the first son. After that, he went to see Habar Islaaleed, who had also given birth to a son they had named Dhowrakace because they had assumed she would miscarry during her pregnancy. He returned to Habaraji, where she unexpectedly gave birth to a second son who would be named Qoorcas, or redneck in English. When he returned to see how Habar Islaaleed was doing, he discovered that she had another son, Daaud, whom they had given the nickname Sabuh because he was born in June, the month of Sabuh. Once everything was finished, both wives claimed that their firstborn was the eldest son. Abti-idig called the family together and declared that he should make his will known, stating that he didn't think he would have any more children. He declared Warwaaq was his eldest son, and he declared that he would maintain the family's firstborn title. He went on to say that his second son Dhowrakace would have the progeny that led all the Ayr because his mother had royal characteristics and that the leadership of the Ayr be left to him. The progeny would be identified as the long-awaited ruler by a prominent birthmark or bright mark on his arm.

Once all the births were complete, both wives claimed that their firstborn was the eldest. Abti-Idig gathered his family and declared his will, stating that he did not believe he would have more children. He proclaimed Warwaaq as his eldest son, ensuring that he retained the title of firstborn. He then decreed that his second son, Dhowrakace, would have descendants who would lead all of the Ayr clan, as his mother possessed royal qualities. The rightful ruler among Dhowrakace’s progeny, he said, would be recognised by a prominent birthmark or bright mark on his arm or neck.

== Clan tree ==
Ali Jimale Ahmed outlines the Hawiye clan genealogical tree in The Invention of Somalia:

- Hawiye
  - Gorgate
    - Daame
      - Hiraab
      - Madarkicis (Habar Gidir)
        - Mahamed (Ayr)
          - Wace Mahamed (Yabadhaale)
            - Sunad Nabi Wace
            - Sabuh Wace
          - Mucle Mahamed
            - Abti-idig Mucle
              - Warwaaq Abti-idig } Habar-eji
              - Xaryanle/Qoorcas Abti-idig } Habar-eji
              - Daa'uud Abti-idig 'Sabuuh' } Habar-Islaaleed
              - Dhorwarkace Abti-idig } Habar-Islaaleed
                - Dhalow Dhorwakace } Yabar-Dhowrakace
                - Madah-diir Dhowrakace } Yabar-Dhowrakace
                - Bilaal Dhowrakace } Yabar-Dhowrakace
                - Samadoor Dhowrakace
                  - Xasan Samadoor
                  - Cabdalle Samadoor
                    - Axmed Cabdalle
                      - Caroole Axmed
                        - Babaanshe Caroole
                        - Suubiye Caroole
                        - Ayaanle Caroole
                        - Caalin Caroole 'Ugaas'
                        - Cabsiiye Caroole

The Ayr clan is divided into 10 major subgroups that are similar in size and ability to pay diya (blood-money). They are:

- 1-Habar-Aji (Warwaaq+Xaryanle) also the eldest
- 2-Ayaanle
- 2-Absiye(Cabsiiye)
- 4-Yabar-dhowrakace(All descendants of Dhowrakace excluding Samadoor Dhowrakace)
- 5-Yabadhaale
- 6-Babaanshe
- 7-Sabuuh
- 8-Hassan Samadoorte
- 9-Caalin Ugaas
- 10-Suubiye Caroole

== Prominent figures ==
- Abdiqasim Salad Hassan, president of Somalia from 2000 to 2004 and held 7 ministerial posts in the Siad Barre government.
- General Galal, who was a Major General and former Deputy defence minister who prepared and led the Ogaden War 1977 one of the leaders of the Ethiopian war in 1977.
- Xaashi ali rooble, who was a Major General and one of the leaders of the Ethiopian war in 1977 and who were the general who participated in the liberation of Somalia.
- Ahmed Abdisalam Adan a Somali radio journalist, media founder and politician. He is a co-founder of HornAfrik Media Inc. based in Mogadishu. In the 2000s, he also served as a Deputy Prime Minister and Minister of Public Security in the former Transitional Federal Government
- Jibriil Hassan Owner and chairman of Premier Bank the largest and most successful Islamic bank in East Africa and most successful mobile money service in Somalia.
- Haji Mohamed Ahmed Liibaan 'Axyaa Wadani' Somali poet who recited over 500 poems from Harardhere and an SYL activist.
- Mohamed Sheikh Osman, Leader of the Somali African Union Party that played a role in gaining independence for the Somali nation. They party was the second most popular party in Colonial Somalia after the Somali Youth League. He was also the first politician of the Ayr clan and was the representative for Italian-Somaliland consulate in India in the year 1925 and a UN representative in 1940.
- Salad Elmi Durwa, the first Ayr MP elected in Beledweyne 1960, he also served as the deputy head of the council of ministers in the first Somali government.
- Mahamud Ghelle Elmi 'Durwa', Former industrial and commerce minister who built the major Somali road network, Stadium Mogadishu and Banadir Hospital.
- Salad Osman Roble politician, Somali National Youth Leader
- Abdirahman Abdishakur WarsameThe leader of the Wadajir Party, former Minister of planning and a member of the Somalia Federal Parliament.
- Abdisamad Malin Mahamud former foreign minister of Somalia and Member of Parliament.
- Colonel Hassan Dahir Aweys, Somali Colonel, head of the 90-member Shura council of the Islamic Courts Union, Leader Hizbul Islam
- Mahad Mohamed Salad, State Minister for Presidential Palace and the current director of the Somali national Security Intelligence agency, NISA.
- Yusuf Garaad Omar, most renowned Somali journalist for BBC Somalia, diplomat and politician, Somali Minister of Foreign Affairs
- General Abdulqadir Ali Dirie 'Subhanyo' a high-ranking Somali General that played a crucial role in the Ogaden War of 1977 and was one of the generals that captured the town of Dire Dawa.
- Yusuf Mohammed Siad Inda'ade, head of security affairs for the Islamic Courts Union, Somali defence minister (TFG).
- Colonel Mahmud Shabeel, a high ranking and well renowned Somali colonel that took part in the Ogaden war. He was more famously known for his efforts in the Somali rebel group United Somali Congress that ousted President Siad Barre. He was the lead colonel in repelling Siad barres attempt to retake power in 1991 in the battle of Xadka iyo Xawaaraha of Agooye.
- Abdi Shakur Sheikh Hassan He served as the Minister of Interior Affairs and National Security in the Transitional Federal Government of Somalia.
- Yusuf Mire Seeraar a Somali Colonel and founder of the Juba-Valley alliance
- General Goobaale, High-ranking military general that was one of the founder of the Jubba-Valley alliance during the Somali civil war.
- Malin Mahamud was the founder of the paramilitary group Ahlu Sunna Waljama'a that played a crucial in defeating Al-shabab extremist group in central Somalia.
- Abdihakim Malin is a Somali Senator in the Upper house of parliament and a representing member of Somalia in the Pan-African Parliament.
- Hasan Adan Samatar, one of the most famous Somali singers of classical Somali music, guitarist and theatrical performer. He is a renowned singer across the Somali Peninsula and had many hits in the 80s.
- Magool, similar to Hasan Adan Samatar was a famous classical Somali singer. She is a renowned singer across the Somali Peninsula and was the opening singer of the African Union convention meeting of 1980.
- Aden Hashi Farah, former leader of al-Shabaab, the youth movement of the Islamic Courts Union.
