= Radio for Peacebuilding Africa =

Radio program

Radio for Peacebuilding Africa (RFPA) was a program founded in 2003 by the international non-profit organization Search for Common Ground. Working on the assumption that radio is the most accessible form of mass communication in Africa, RFPA trained journalists in peacebuilding, conflict resolution, and acting on commonalities.

The countries served by RFPA were Angola, Burundi, Côte d'Ivoire, Democratic Republic of the Congo, Sierra Leone, Guinea, Zimbabwe, Tanzania, Togo, Uganda, Somalia, Rwanda, Nigeria, Niger, Liberia, Kenya, Chad, the Central African Republic, Congo Brazzaville, and Cameroon.

RFPA was created by SFCG and was supported in part by the Ministry of Foreign Affairs of Finland.

== Mission ==
The founders of RFPA believed that radio broadcasters can affect some of the conflict and civil unrest that have affected African countries. However, they found that radio broadcasters exaggerated the violence facing African societies on a daily basis instead of working to temper strife.

By promoting a discussion of the "middle ground" in debates, as well as tempering extreme outlying opinions played on their air, RFPA hoped to show that common ground is possible and that conflicts do not have to be solved by violence.

To support its mission, Radio for Peacebuilding Africa aimed to broaden the skills of broadcasters working in Africa. RFPA supported youth radio broadcasters and encouraged the diversifying of viewpoints on the air.

RFPA worked with politicians to increase the flow of communications between governments and the civil society, as well as encouraging the SFCG mission of acting on the commonalities between different societies and ethnicities. Specifically, RFPA targeted broadcasters, governmental officials and members of the civil society in each state.

To address their mission, RFPA developed a multilingual training guide and module for broadcasters and journalists. They also organized fora and regional conferences to discuss challenges and issues facing projects. They organized two competitions to reward the top programs structured around the themes in the training guides.

== Peacebuilding techniques ==
The founders of RFPA believed that news reporting isn't the only way to promote common ground. Forms of communication such as "soap-opera" style programming, music, theater, and talkshows were designed to promote open discussion of issues and foster ties between communities.

As a part of its mission, RFPA worked to develop a series of guidebooks about peace building techniques through radio. These books were the foundation for the RFPA annual awards. These guidebooks can be applied to all forms of communication worldwide, not just for radio in Africa.

These techniques included inviting all sides of an issue into dialogue, identifying and examining assumptions, challenging stereotypes, sharing hopes, dreams and future visions, giving ordinary people a chance to tell their story, using precise words, clarifying opinions and finding and presenting alternative solutions, among other techniques.

== Achievements ==
As of the summer of 2010, RFPA had more than 3,000 members representing 100 countries, across Sub-Saharan Africa and beyond. The organization produced seven guidebooks that have been downloaded over 4,800 times. They carried out over 90 workshops and trained local radio station personnel.

RFPA claimed that it had reached new levels of cooperation between the government, media and civil society, increased the ability of radio stations to identify the underlying causes of war and conflict, increased the public's access to policy information, and used media to foster communication between policy makers and the civil society within that state, among other achievements.

== Countries ==
Of the countries in which RFPA had programs or participating stations, eleven (Burundi, Central African Republic, Kenya, Liberia, Niger, Nigeria, Senegal, Sierra Leone, Tanzania, Togo, and Uganda) had "partially free" status under Freedom House's 2010 Freedom in the World annual report, which ranked the degree of democracy and political freedom in each country in the world; levels of political freedom and civil rights were ranked on a scale of 1 through 7, and each country was assigned a status of "free", "partially free" or "not free". Nine countries in which RFPA had programs or participating stations (Cameroon, Chad, Congo Brazzaville, DR Congo, Ivory Coast, Rwanda, Somalia, Sudan and Zimbabwe) had "not free" status under the same ranking systems.

=== Participating stations ===
Africa:

- Africa N°1

Burundi

- Bonesha FM
- Radio Isanganiro
- Radio Publique Africaine

Cameroon

- Cameroon Radio Television
- Equinoxe
- Radio Siantou
- Real Time Music
- Venus FM

Central African Republic

- Radio Ndeke Luka

Chad

- Radio nationale tchadienne

Congo Brazzaville

- Radio Congo
- Radio Liberté

Democratic Republic of the Congo

- Canal Revelation
- Radio Maendeleo
- Radio Okapi
- Radio Télévision Nationale Congolaise

Ivory Coast

- Onuci-FM
- Radio Bonne Santé
- Radio Côte d'Ivoire
- Radio Espoir
- Radio Femmes Solidarité
- Radio Yopougon

Kenya

- Citizen FM
- Hope FM
- Kameme FM
- Kenya Broadcasting Company
- Nation FM

Liberia

- Kiss FM
- Radio Veritas

Niger

- Voix du Sahel ORTN

Nigeria

- Federal Radio Corporation of Nigeria
- Radio RayPower
- Rhythm FM
- Voice of Nigeria

Rwanda

- Radio Izuba
- Radio Rwanda

Sénégal

- Afia FM

Sierra Leone

- Kiss
- Radio Democracy

Somalia

- Radio Galkayo
- Radio HornAfrik
- Radio Voice of Peace

Sudan

- Sudan Radio Service

Tanzania

- Radio Kwizera

Togo

- Nana FM

Uganda

- Capital Radio
- Mega FM
- Paidha FM
- West Nile/Pacis

Zimbabwe

- Zimbabwe Broadcasting Corporation
