= Hindia =

Hindia may refer to:

- Hindia (genus), a prehistoric sponge genus
- Hindia (singer) (born 1994), Indonesian singer-songwriter
- Hindia Haji Mohamed (c. 1988–2015), Somali journalist
- Handia, Madhya Pradesh, a village in India also known as Hindia
