= Aden Ayro =

Former Al Shabaab military commander

- Born: Aden Hashi Farah Ayro; 1976; Somalia
- Died: 1 May 2008 (aged 31–32); Dhusamareb, Somalia
- Cause of death: U.S. airstrike
- Other name: Abu Muhsin al-Ansari
- Known for: Military commander of al-Shabaab
- Spouse: Halima Abdi Issa Yusuf

Aden Hashi Farah Ayro (Somali: Aaden Xaashi Faarax Ceyroow, Arabic: آدن حاشي فارح عيرو) (1976 – 1 May 2008), also known by his nom de guerre Abu Muhsin al-Ansari was a Somali militant and senior commander in Al-Shabaab. He was from the Ayr sub-clan, part of the Habar Gidir, which is a branch of the Hawiye clan.

He was among several insurgents and civilians killed in a U.S. airstrike in the Dhusamareb airstrike on 1 May 2008.

== History ==
Aden Hashi Farah Aero was born in 1976. He was from the Ayr sub-clan, part of the Habar Gidir, which is a branch of the Hawiye clan. He received training in Afghanistan during the 1990s and reportedly met senior Al-Qaeda members there.

In 2003 the CIA began supporting secular warlords against Somali Islamists. According to International Crisis Group, it was after his time in Afghanistan that he went back to Somalia in 2003 to set up a network with other al-Itihaad al-Islamiya veterans to assassinate foreigners and opponents, culminating in the eventual deaths of four foreign aid workers and at least ten Somali former military and police officers alleged to be working with western intelligence services. According to The Guardian, Ayro was linked to the murder of four western aid workers and more than a dozen Somalis." In July 2004, the CIA received a tip about the possible presence of bomb-maker Abu Taha al-Sudani in a Mogadishu compound owned by Ayro. A raid, led by militia loyal to factional leader Mohamed Qanare, ensued, but both al-Sudani and Ayro were not present, resulting in the death of Ayro's brother-in-law during a brief firefight.

Throughout Somalia, religious authorities who were collaborating with rising Islamic Courts Union began being kidnapped, pushing the organization to adopt a more confrontational stance against the warlords. The Islamic Courts claimed that covert US government operations and warlords were targeting high ranking ICU officials. According to C. Barnes & H. Hassan, "It was in this context that a military force known as Al-Shabaab (‘the Youth’) emerged, related to but seemingly autonomous of the broad based Courts movement." At the time it was widely believed in Mogadishu that Somali warlords were cooperating with U.S. intelligence agents carry out kidnappings.

In June 2006, al-Shabab fighters led the ICU to victory in Mogadishu over a U.S.-backed alliance of self-styled anti-terrorist warlords. Once in power, Ayro seized the position of military chief of all ICU forces and oversaw the expansion of al-Shabaab into a much larger force, absorbing other ICU militias. It was during this time that al-Shabaab was formally created. Ayro, his mentor Sheikh Hassan Dahir Aweys, and other hardliners were said to have used al-Shabab to intimidate, threaten and sideline scores of moderate ICU leaders. The United Nations claimed Ayro had sent ICU fighters to support Hezbollah against Israel in Lebanon.

Many members and affiliates of the Islamic Courts Union had been killed during the invasion, leaving a vacuum for the small group of several hundred youth that served as the ICU's Shabaab militia to gain prominence. Many ordinary citizens had been radicalized by the US-backed Ethiopian invasion, enabling al-Shabaab to firmly embed itself in the regions social, economic and political environment. Notably, al-Shabaab's command structure had become decentralized, with the group broken down into cells. This decentralization allowed commanders greater autonomy to plan and execute attacks as they deemed necessary. The group particularly empowered by the occupation, as it established itself as an independent resistance faction in early 2007. The group became battle hardened over the next two years and notably began governing territory for the first time in 2008.

Theresa Whelan, the U.S. Deputy Assistant Secretary of Defense for African Affairs, in a press conference on 17 January 2007, said she believed the U.S. AC-130 gunship raid which occurred on 8 January had killed eight fighters linked to Aden Hashi Farah Aero. Aero was believed to have been wounded in the attack and perhaps killed. However, on 7 March 2007 an audio tape issued by Aden Hashi Aero was sent to the Koran Radio station in Mogadishu.

Following his injury in the U.S. airstrike, Ayro vanished. Due to al-Shabaab's decentralized command structure, it was not clear who was in overall charge of the group. In March 2007, al-Qaeda named Ayro as its top leader in Somalia, suggesting that he was still engaged in al-Shabaab activities and communicating with his commanders in Mogadishu from his hideout. Ayro briefly returned to Mogadishu in August 2007 but was asked to leave by concerned clan elders because they feared he would "bring more trouble to everybody". He was reported to have been constantly on the move, seldom staying in one place for long, typically spending only a few days in each location. In December 2007, a Somali website announced Ahmed Godane, known as Abu Zubeyr, as the official Emir of al-Shabaab.

== Death ==
On 1 May 2008, Aero and another important leader of the al-Shabaab, Sheikh Muhyadin Omar, were killed by a U.S. airstrike on his house in the town of Dhusamareb. Paul Salopek reported in the Chicago Tribune that jihadists vowed to kill every foreigner in Somalia in response.

After the killing of the group's leader Aden Hashi Ayro in 2008, al-Shabaab began publicly courting Osama bin Laden in a bid to become part of al-Qaeda, but was rebuffed by bin Laden.

== See also ==
- Islamic Courts Union
