= The Journey (Maryam Mursal album) =

Studio album by Maryam Mursal
- Released: 1998
- Studio: Real World
- Label: Real World
- Producers: Simon Emmerson, Martin Russell

The Journey is the solo debut album by the Somali musician Maryam Mursal. It was released in 1998 by Real World Records. Mursal supported the album by touring with the Africa Fete festival.

== Production ==
The Journey documents Mursal's flight from war-torn Somalia through deserts to Denmark. It was produced by Simon Emmerson and Martin Russell, with arrangements by Soren Jenson. Hossam Ramzy played percussion on the album. Peter Gabriel contributed backing vocals. Among the backing musicians were members of Waaberi and Danish session players. "Lei Lei" is a reworked version of the Waaberi song "Cidlaan Dareemaya". "Hamar" is an instrumental track. "Qax" and "Somali Udiida Ceb" were written during Mursal's trek.

== Critical reception ==
Professional ratings
Review scores
Source	Rating
The Age	3.5/5 stars
AllMusic	4.5/5 stars
Robert Christgau	(1-star Honorable Mention)
The Encyclopedia of Popular Music	4/5 stars
The Guardian	4/5 stars
MusicHound World: The Essential Album Guide	5/5 stars

The Observer wrote that the album "dazzlingly mixes West African and Arabic roots with western production values." The New York Times determined that "Mursal sounds too tough to let herself be reduced to an exotic sonic ingredient." Rolling Stone concluded that "Mursal refuses to remain a prisoner of her native styles, embracing the frank beats and feral musical constructions of European, Middle Eastern and African nightclubs."

The Irish Times deemed the album "a healthy hybrid that is fuelled by Mursal's passionate vocals—and impressive playing by a host of musicians." The Gazette noted that "all manner of high-tech, worldbeat stuff has been grafted on to Mursal's Somali roots music." The Chicago Tribune stated that The Journey "frames Mursal's extraordinary alto voice inside an array of musical textures created by strings, horn samples from old mambo records, wah-wah guitars, accordions and traditional instruments." The Morning Call, The Washington Post, and the Chicago Tribune listed it among 1998's best albums.

AllMusic wrote that "the layers of sound on this disc blend techno with a more traditional Afro-pop sound."

== Track listing ==
No.	Title	Length
1.	"Lei Lei (I Feel Alone)"
2.	"Kufïlaw (Take Care)"
3.	"Somali Udiida Ceb (Somalia, Don't Shame Yourself)"
4.	"Sodewou (Welcome)"
5.	"Hamar (The Big City)"
6.	"Qax (Refugee)"
7.	"Nin Hun (Bad Man)"
8.	"Fejigno (Beware)"
