= Tehmina Kaoosji =

Indian journalist, broadcaster and media personality in Malaysia (born 1984)

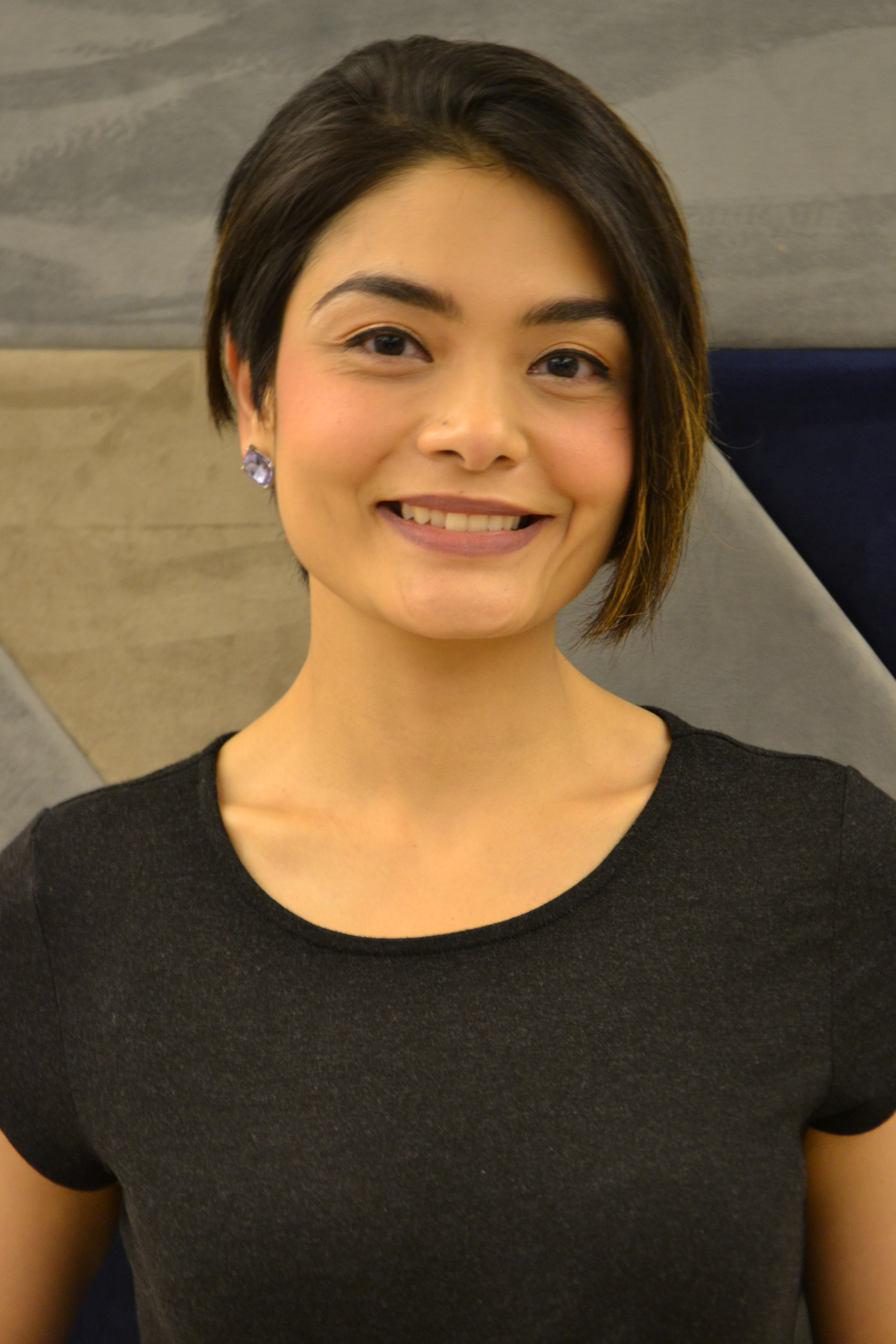
- Kaoosji in 2019
- Born: May 15, 1984 (age 42); Hyderabad, India
- Occupations: Journalist, producer, activist, actress
- Years active: 2013–present

Tehmina Bakhtyar Kaoosji (born 15 May 1984) is an Indian journalist, producer, activist and actress. Based in Malaysia, she is known for her advocacy towards gender equality and social justice. She has been featured on various media outlets, and has participated in various panel debates.

== Early life ==
Kaoosji was born in Hyderabad, Andhra Pradesh, India to a Parsi father and a Malaysian Hakka Chinese mother. She received her early primary education at Niraj Public School, an Indian School Certificate (ICSE)- affiliated day school in Hyderabad, India.

Her family migrated to Kuala Lumpur, Malaysia in 1995, where she completed her ‘O’Levels at Fairview International School. In her teens, Kaoosji trained in musical theatre, performing and touring with Operafest Children's Choir. She studied Journalism and Psychology under HELP University’s American Degree Programme. She is also an International Baccalaureate certified English Language & Literature instructor.

== Career ==
=== Journalism, broadcast and activism ===
Kaoosji is an independent broadcast journalist with a long background in pedagogy. She moved into media via modelling and her broadcast career began when she hosted Tourism Malaysia’s online travel & tourism-centric shows, Travel Info and Tourism Buzz, from 2013 to 2015. From 2014- October 2020 she hosted English-language current affairs talk shows on Bernama News Channel, namely Bernama Today, The Nation and her own online talkshow focusing on women, Tea with Tehmina.

She currently anchors Money Matters, TV3 Malaysia's flagship financial talkshow, focusing on economics & business-related current affairs issues.

She covers political, economic and social justice issues from a global, regional and local perspective, securing and producing exclusive interviews with global bodies, thought leaders and personalities ranging from The World Bank, UNFPA, UNICEF, Bundesliga, Global Bersih, and the Ministry of Women, Family and Community Development, as well as diplomats, small business owners, artists and sporting superstars, such as Ronaldinho. She is a board member and director with the Institute of Journalists Malaysia.

In 2019, Kaoosji represented Malaysia and Bernama News Channel at the CGTN (TV channel) Dialogue of Asian Civilizations. She was one of four Asian media personnel who participated in a dialogue on Asian civilizations. She has spoken at various events, which include the World Bank Malaysia Economic Monitor, National Consultation for a Malaysian Media Council, Women Changing the Content Landscape in Malaysia, TedX KL 2019 and the 2019 Georgetown Literary Festival.

=== Acting ===
Kaoosji is a trained musical theatre practitioner and has also worked in acting. She was formerly a commercial model, appearing in campaigns for major regional and international brands.

In 2015, she had a role in the Michael Mann directed film Blackhat, appearing as a pharmacy speaker. In 2016, Kaoosji was cast as the titular character, Sara, in the horror found-footage style video game Sara Is Missing.

SIM went viral throughout the internet and the video sharing site YouTube at the time of release.

In 2019, she appeared as Rosa Khan in the film Shadowplay, and appeared in the Viu series Devoted, as Kay.

== Filmography ==
- Blackhat (2015, uncredited appearance)
- Sara Is Missing (2016)
- Shadowplay (2019)
- Devoted (2019–present)
