= Habar Gidir =

Subclan of the Hawiye and the even larger Samaale clan

Habar Gidir هبر جدر
- Hawiye Somali Clan
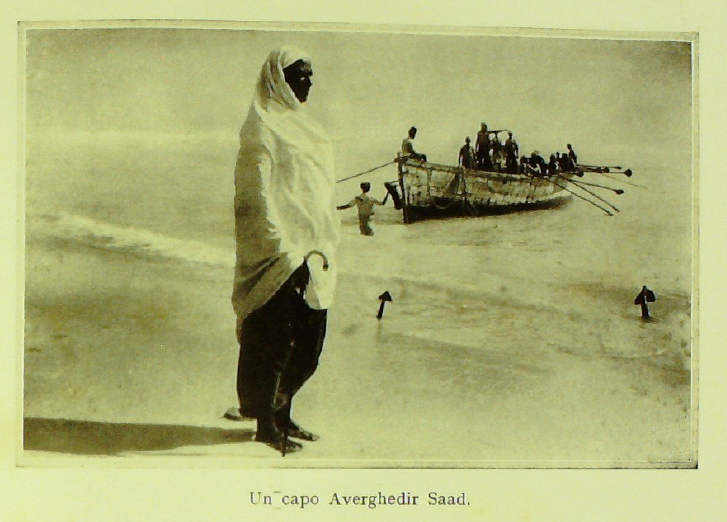
- Chief of the Habar Gidir Sa'ad clan
- Ethnicity: Somali
- Location: Somalia; Ethiopia
- Descended from: Madarki'is Hiraab
- Parent tribe: Hiraab
- Branches: Mohammed (Ayr) Madarkicis; Sa'ad Madarkicis; Sulaiman (Saleebaan) Madarkicis; Ibrahim (Saruur) Madarkicis; Sifaadle Madarkicis
- Language: Somali
- Religion: Sunni Islam

The Habar Gidir (Somali: Habar Gidir, Arabic: هبر جدر) is a subclan of the Hawiye. The clan has produced some prominent Somali figures, including the first Prime Minister of Somalia Abdullahi Issa Mohamud, the 20th century military commander Hersi Gurey, and Somalia's fifth President Abdiqasim Salad Hassan.

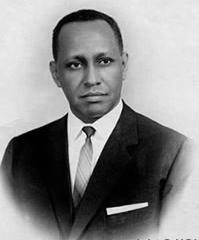
The first Prime Minister of Somalia, Abdullahi Issa Mohamud

== Overview and History ==
The Habar Gidir are one of the largest Somali clan families and inhabit a vast portion of the Somali nation, and Somali peninsula at large. The Habar gidir mainly reside in the central regions of Somalia, notably the Mudug region, the cities of Hobyo, Galkacyo, where they predominate, and are frequently associated with the region itself. The Habar gidir as a clan break into 5 clan families, made up of the: Cayr, Sacad, Saleebaan, Sifaadle. (Duduble.!) and Saruur who are all descended from Madarki’is (Madarkicis Hiraab).:.

=== Hiraab Imamate ===
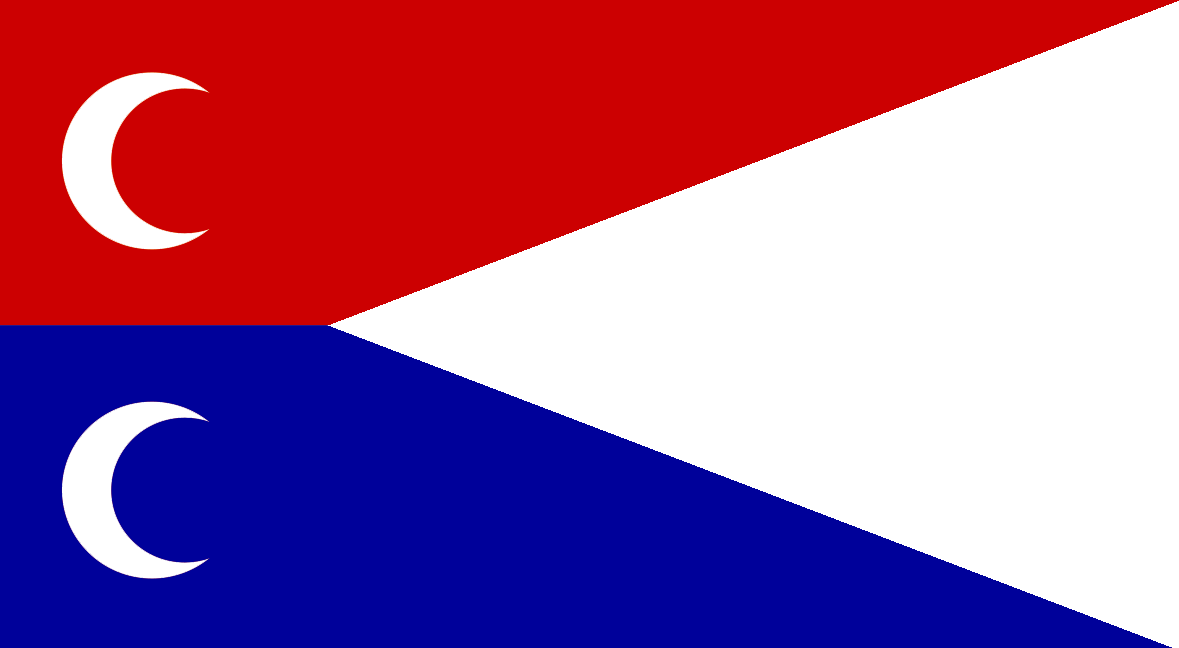
Flag of the Hiraab imamate and Yacquubi rulers

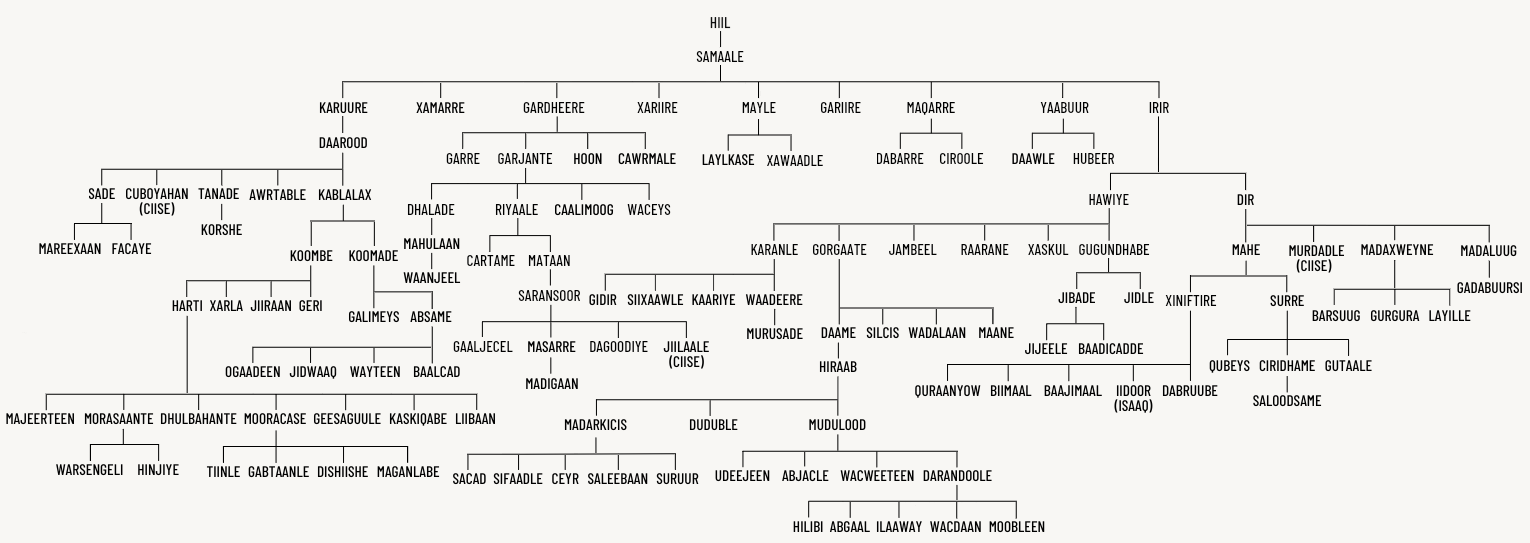
Genealogical tree of Somali clans

During the late 17th century to 1889, the Habar Gidir were a part of the Hiraab Imamate in the Banaadir regions to the Mudug desert, which they played a large role.

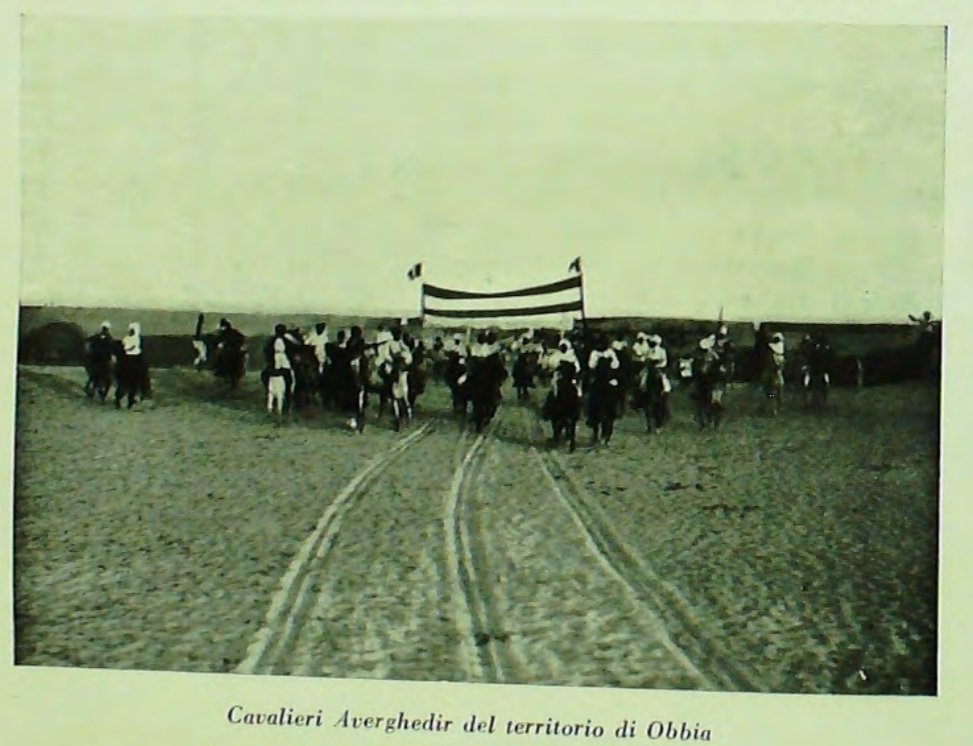
Habar Gidir cavalry in Hobyo

== Etymology ==
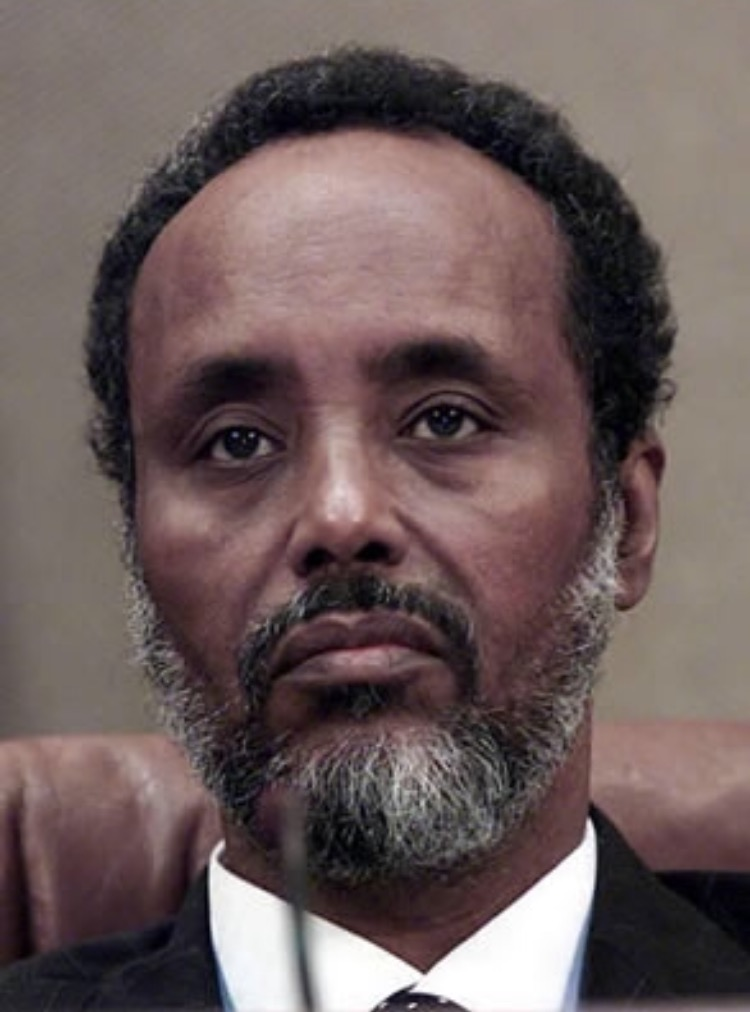
Former president of Somalia, Abdiqasim Salad Hassan

The Habar Gidir are a Hiraab sub-clan. The forefather of the clan is Madarkicis Hiraab and Habar Gidir is the name of their mother, Gidir Karanle, the sister of Murusade. Madarkicis is part of the Hiraab section of Hawiye. Madarkicis translates to "gathering causer'' or ''The one who rouses meetings" in the Somali language. The name Habar gidir is derived from Madarkicis' appreciation to Raarey Gidir, who gave birth to two of his sons out of a total of five and nurtured all of his children, Madarkicis afterwards made the prayer that Raarey Gidir's name surpasses his to convey his thanks for her care.

== Role and influence in Somalia ==
The Habar Gidir clan has produced prominent figures such as the first Prime Minister of Somalia Abdullahi Issa Mohamud, who hailed from the Sa'ad subclan; Reer Nima'ale. Abdullahi Issa played one of the most important roles if not the most important role in bringing independence for the Somali nation. He stood firm in his beliefs against the occupying Italians and ensured to get them out of the country legally and bring Somalis freedom in which he was victorious.

Somalia's fifth president Abdiqasim Salad Hassan also hails from the Habargidir, Ayr, Absiiye. The president was elected at a time when Somalia had not seen governance for nearly a decade and was elected in the town of Arta in Djibouti by Somali delegates representing the various Somali clans and factions. His government faced great challenges despite his will to restore the Somali nation to its better past. He was also a very important figure in Mohamed Siyad Barres Regime and held 7 ministerial posts in the span of the regimes rule.

General Mohamed Farah Aydid, also from the Habar Gidir, is regarded as the most influential general in modern Somali political history. Mohamed Farah Aydid was a Major General who was instrumental in the 1977 Ogaden war against Ethiopia to liberate the unlawfully occupied Somali Region. After other Somali clans failed to overthrow President Mohamed Siyad Barre's totalitarian rule, the General played the most essential role in overthrowing the Kacaan regime. General Aydid was the Chairman and Leader of the United Somali Congress faction [USC]which ousted Mohamed Siyad Barre after a brutal war.

== Prominent figures ==
=== Political ===
- Abdiqasim Salad Hassan, President of Somalia 2000-2004
- Abdullahi Ahmed Addou, Ambassador to the United States (1970–80), finance minister (1980-84)
- Abdullahi Issa, (chairman of the Somali Youth League and first prime minister of Somalia, 1949-1960
- Ali Shido Abdi, one the earliest members of SYL and former vice chairman
- Mohamed Farrah Aidid, United Somali Congress leader who ousted Siad Barre's regime
- Asha Haji Elmi, political and peace activist
- Haji Farah Ali Omar, the first Somali finance minister, the inventor of the Somali five shilling
- Dr Hussein Ali Shido, Leader United Somali Congress In roma, One Of the Fonders USC
- Hassan Dahir Aweys, head of the council of the Islamic Courts of Somalia and was also a colonel in the Somali National Army and served in the 1977 Ogaden War against Ethiopia
- Hussein Mohamed Farrah, Somali National Alliance (SNA), Somalia Reconciliation and Restoration Council (SRRC) and Transitional Federal Government (TFG) leader, son of Mohammed Farah Aidid
- Ibrahim Hassan Addou, foreign minister for the Islamic Courts of Somalia
- Mohamoud Mohamed Gacmodhere, a onetime Prime Minister of Somalia and Presidential candidate.
- Mohamed Warsame Ali, senior diplomat, was the founder and the first president of Galmudug state, elected on 14 August 2006, when Galmudug state was established.
- Osman Ali Atto, Business man, politician, warlord and leader of SNA.
- Yusuf Mohammed Siad Inda'ade, head of security affairs for the Islamic Courts Union
- Ahmed Abdi Karie, is a Somali politician who serves as the current President of Galmudug state. He assumed office on 2 February 2020.

=== Literature ===
- Abdi Bashiir Indhobuur poet and composer who wrote many famous patriotic songs such as Gefka uma dulqaatan, Arligeygow, Iminka dhudhumiya
- Siciid Xarawo Poet and composer who wrote patriotic songs i.e. Towradatan Barakaysan, Anigu Diidneye Ogow, Goormaa Ladnaanayee
- Magool, (Halima Khaliif Omar), Somali singer and musician
- Hasan Adan Samatar He is a singer and Famous somali musician,
- Maxamed Cumar Noor Nidaamiye, poet and composer wrote many loves songs i.e. Moog iyo Jacayl waa maxay, Sida Hogosha Roobka
- K'naan, is a Somali-Canadian rapper, singer-songwriter and filmmaker. He rose to fame after releasing the single "Wavin' Flag", His grandfather was a famous poet, and his aunt Magool, was a renowned somali singer

=== Journalists and newsmen ===
- Mohamed Haji (Ingiriis), a journalist based in Brussels.
