= Somali International University =

University in Somalia

Somali International University (SIU) is a private non-profit community owned university located in Mogadishu, Somalia that opened in 2012 (14 years ago).

== Overview ==
The university has six faculties. Each faculty has several departments. SIU offers over 30 degree programs at undergraduate and postgraduate level. The postgraduate programs are in collaboration with Kenyatta University.

== Faculties ==
=== Faculty of Medicine and Health Sciences ===
Departments

1. General Medicine and Surgery
2. General Nursing
3. Nursing and Midwifery
4. Medical Laboratory Science
5. Public Health

=== Faculty of Business and Economics ===
Departments

1. Business Administration
2. Accounting & Finance
3. Accounting
4. Banking and Finance
5. Business Information Systems
6. Economics
7. Economics and Statistics
8. Economics

=== Faculty of Engineering and Computer Technology ===
1. Computer Science
2. Civil Engineering

=== Faculty of Arts and Social Sciences ===
Departments

1. Politics and International Relations
2. Public Administration and Leadership
3. Politics and Government Studies 3
4. Criminology and Media Studies
5. Journalism and Media Studies

=== Faculty of Sharia and Law ===
Departments

1. Sharia
2. Sharia and Law
3. Secular Law

== SIU Academic System ==
Somali International University academic year is divided into two semesters and a summer session. A semester lasts approximately 16 weeks.

== Partnerships ==
SIU has a very active International Office that has seen the university through its many partnerships with leading universities within East Africa. Today, over 50 of SIU medical students spend up to one year in Uganda and Kenya for their final year of medical school. The International Office is headed by Dr. Okello Andrew, a Ugandan medical doctor who was also among the first foreign medical practitioners to serve in the country. Besides the International Office, Dr. Okello is a routine medical doctor in the university's teaching hospitals. The notable universities in East Africa are;

- Gulu University (Uganda)
- Kenyatta University (Kenya)
- Makerere University (Uganda)
- Mbarara University of Science and Technology (Uganda)
- University of Nairobi (Kenya)

== Notable alumni ==
- Hindia Haji Mohamed, broadcast radio and TV journalist and producer
