= Abdi Jeylani Malaq Marshale =

- Born: ca. 1969; Mogadishu, Somalia
- Died: 31 July 2012; Mogadishu, Somalia
- Occupations: Comedian and media worker
- Employer(s): Kulmiye Radio & Universal TV
- Known for: social commentary in his comedic performances

Abdi Jeylani Malaq Marshale, also known as Abdi Jeylani Malaq or Abdi Jeylani Marshale, (ca. 1969 – 31 July 2012) was a popular comedian on both radio and TV from Somalia who was targeted by Al-Shabaab militants and later assassinated in Mogadishu.

== Personal ==
He hailed from the Bantu ethnic minority community.

== Career ==
Marshale worked as a writer, actor, comedian and producer at Mogadishu's Kulmiye Radio and for Universal TV, a London-based Somali satellite television station.

Marshale, one of the country's most popular comedians, was known for his parodies of local Islamist militants and the Transitional Federal Government. He had been threatened by the Al-Shabaab insurgent group in 2011, forcing him to hide in the northern Somaliland region for several days.

== Death ==
Mentioned locations in Somalia in relation to Mogadishu.

On 31 July 2012, Marshale was shot by two unidentified and pistol-wielding men around 7 p.m. shortly after leaving the Kulmiye Radio station and before arriving at his home in the Waberi district of Mogadishu. He later died from head and chest wounds at the Medina hospital. His funeral was attended by hundreds of journalists, relatives, supporters and dignitaries.

== Impact ==
At the time of his assassination, he was the eighth person to be killed in targeted attacks on media personnel in Somalia in 2012, according to Amnesty International.

In October 2012, Warsame Shire Awale, a comedian and musician who also worked for Kulmiye Radio and had also lampooned the Al-Shabaab, was also assassinated.

== Reactions ==
Augustine Mahiga, representing the United Nations, said, "Almost every month we mourn a victim in the Somali media world. This is simply unacceptable." Mahiga called for investigation of perpetrators of such crimes and for them to be held accountable.

Bénédicte Goderiaux, an Amnesty International researcher, said, "Amnesty International is shocked not only by the continuing pattern of targeted attacks against media, but also at the inaction of the Somali authorities to protect them and to investigate these attacks seriously. Not a single person has been brought to justice for the killings of journalists in Somalia this year, nor in previous years."

Reporters Without Borders issued the following statement: "This tragedy is a cruel reminder that nothing stops free expression’s enemies in Africa’s deadliest country for the media. Anyone who dares to speak out against Al-Shabaab’s crimes in Somalia is signing their own death warrant. These barbaric acts have never elicited an effective reaction from either the local authorities or the international community. Must the list of victims keep on growing before those responsible cease to enjoy complete impunity?"

== See also ==
- List of journalists killed during the Somali civil war
