= Ahmed Abdisalam Adan =

Somali journalist

- Born: Somalia
- Other name: Ahmed Mohamed Aden
- Citizenship: Somali, Canadian
- Occupations: Journalist, Deputy Prime Minister, and Minister of Public Security
- Organization(s): HornAfrik Media, Inc., Transitional Federal Government of Somalia
- Known for: co-founding HornAfrik Media Inc.

Ahmed Abdisalam Adan, also known as Ahmed Mohamed Aden, is a Somali radio journalist, media founder and politician. He is a co-founder of HornAfrik Media Inc based in Mogadishu. In the 2000s, he also served as a Deputy Prime Minister and Minister of Public Security in the former Transitional Federal Government.

== Personal life ==
Adan was born around 1959 in Somalia. He relocated with his family to Ottawa, Ontario, Canada during the 1980s, just prior to the start of the civil war in his country of birth. Adan thereafter worked in social services for Ottawa–Carleton. He decided to return to Somalia along with Mohamed Elmi and Ali Iman Sharmarke to found the HornAfrik media company in 1999.

== HornAfrik ==
On December 12, 1999, Ahmed Abdisalam Adan, Mohamed Elmi, and Ali Iman Sharmarke officially opened HornAfrik Media Inc. in Mogadishu, Somalia. Adan was managing partner and director of programs for HornAfrik through 2007.

An independent broadcast company, HornAfrik produced and maintained a website, two radio stations, and television station. HornAfrik provided news and aired talk shows for Somalis as an alternative to propaganda delivered by media outlets owned by local faction leaders. HornAfrik broadcast content such as BBC and CNN programs, as well as call-in shows that enabled people to express their views on topics of peace, religion, culture, health, women's issues, education, and economy. The broadcasters also aired interviews with faction leaders.

Adan and his partners' work to support free speech and air important local issues earned the ire of Islamist extremists and faction leaders, who sought to maintain control of the capital. As a result, HornAfrik and its employees and operators endured violent attacks and attempts to hush their broadcasts. Adan vowed to continue despite the threats and violence.

== Government service ==
Adan served as the minister for information for the Transitional Federal Government in 2008. After serving as the TFG's minister for information, he acted as a deputy prime minister between 2008 and 2009. According to the WikiLeaks cache of cables, the U.S. approved of Adan's presence as a deputy prime minister.

Adan continued to be active in Somalian politics and the peace process after serving his posts.

In May 2012, Adan was injured in a suicide bombing attack while on a peace mission in Dhusamareb. Two officials in his delegation died and five other people were killed. Adan sustained some injuries, but later recovered.

== Awards ==
Adan and the other founders of HornAfrik Media Inc. earned praise for their work and the support of the Canadian Journalists for Free Expression (CJFE). In 2002, they along with a Kazakh journalist were presented the CJFE International Press Freedom Award.
