= Omar Faruk Osman =

Somali journalist and trade unionist

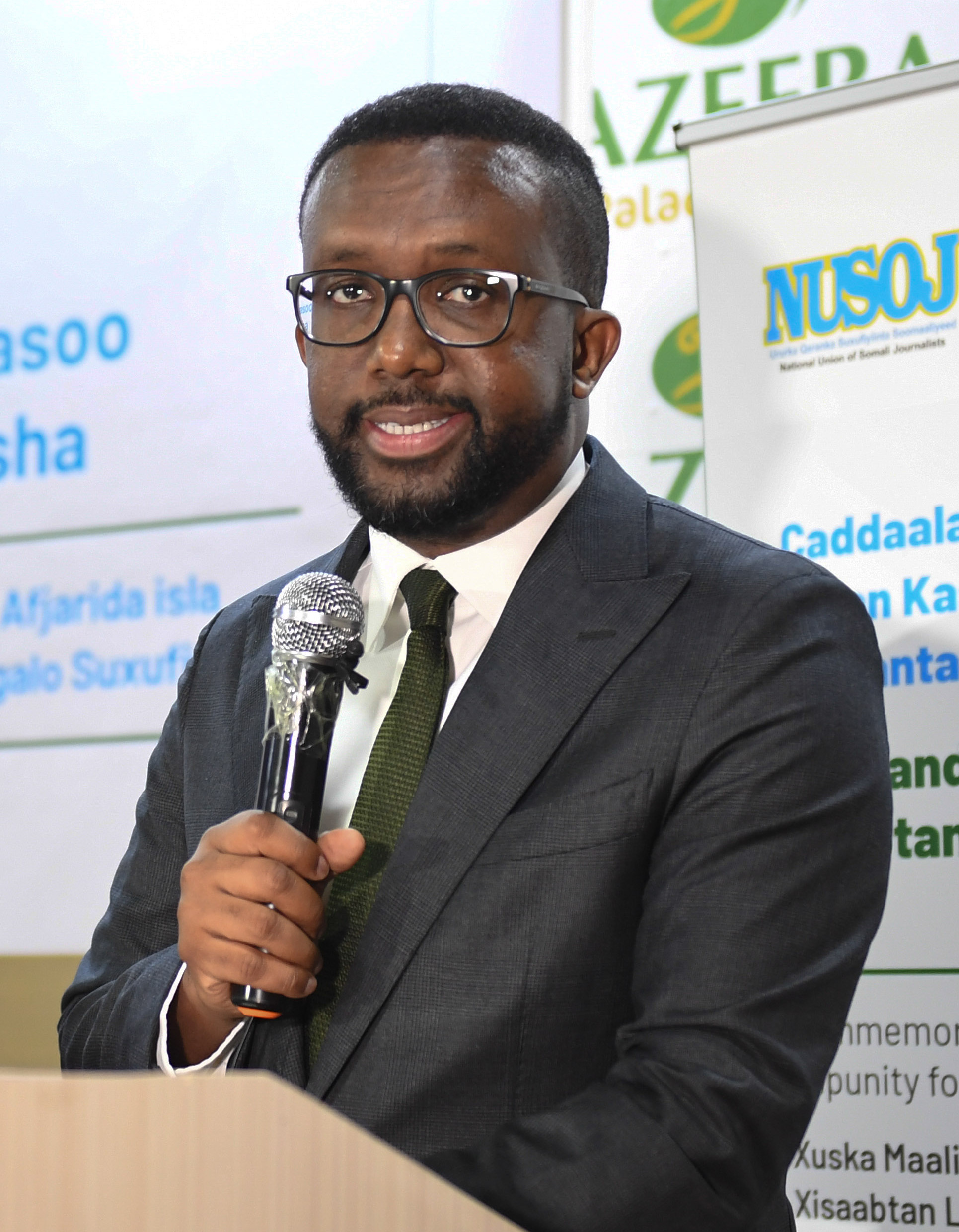
Omar Faruk Osman

Omar Faruk Osman is a Somali journalist and trade unionist, who is the General Secretary of the Federation of Somali Trade Unions (FESTU). As the head of the National Union of Somali Journalists (NUSOJ), he is also a member of the Executive Committee of the Global Union Federation - the International Federation of Journalists (IFJ).
