= Dhusamareb airstrike =

American airstrike in Somalia

- Part of Operation Enduring Freedom - Horn of Africa
- Type: Aerial attack
- Location: Dhuusamarreeb, Somalia
- Target: Islamic militants
- Date: May 1, 2008; 2:30AM (+3)
- Executed by: United States
- Casualties: Up to 40 killed 15 including 4 children injured

The Dhusamareb airstrike took place on May 1, 2008, at around 3:00 am local time when an American plane dropped three large bombs on a house in the Dhuusamarreeb region in central Somalia. The attack was targeted against the militant group al-Shabaab.

The attack killed up to 30 people including civilians and two Islamist leaders, identified by al-Shabaab as Adan Ayrow and Sheikh Mohamed Muhyadin Omar. Four others were injured.

== Reactions ==
Bob Prucha, a US military spokesman, confirmed there was a US attack on a "known al-Qaeda target" and militia leader.

Mukhtar Robow "Abu Mansur", a leader of al-Shabaab, said: "It is true that infidel planes bombed Dhusamareb. This was an unprovoked attack, Aden Hashi Eyrow and Sheikh Mohamed Muhyadin Omar are the most important Shabaab members who were victims of this foreign aggression... The death of Eyrow and Omar will not stop the struggle for the supremacy of Allah and the liberation of the holy land of Somalia. We will continue the struggle until the Somali people are free."

Paul Salopek reported in the Chicago Tribune that jihadists had vowed to kill every foreigner in Somalia in response.

== See also ==
- Manhunt (military)
