= Abukar Hassan Mohamoud =

Somali journalist (c.1969–2012)

- Born: Between 1963-1969?
- Died: 28 February 2012 (age 43-49?); Wadajir district, Mogadishu, Somalia
- Cause of death: Shot five times in the head and chest
- Other name: Kadaf
- Occupations: Manager, director, editor
- Employer: Somaliweyn radio station
- Organization: National Union of Somali Journalists (NUSOJ)
- Known for: Active in youth organizations and helped organize protests in Mogadishu against Al-Shabaab operations
- Spouse: Husband
- Children: 2 daughters

Abukar Hassan Mohamoud, also known as Kadaf (1969? – 28 February 2012), was a Somali activist and the manager/director for the independent Somaliweyn Radio in Mogadishu, Somalia. At the time of his murder, he had been working on a re-launch of Radio Somaliweyn, which had been attacked and looted by Al-Shabaab in 2010.

== Personal ==
Mohamoud had a wife and two daughters.

He was an activist, and police were said by the Committee to Protect Journalists to have beaten him twice and arrested him for publishing what police said was false information.

== Career ==
Mohamoud worked as the manager/director of the independent Somaliweyn radio station in Mogadishu. He had been trying to relaunch Radio Somaliweyn after it was raided and looted by Al-Shabaab insurgents in May 2010.

He was a member of the National Union of Somali Journalists (NUSOJ), and he was a regular participant in union campaigns for the protection of journalists against harassment and physical attack. NUSOJ said he always would sign his name to statements that condemned the murders of his colleagues.

== Death ==
Mentioned locations in Somalia in relation to Mogadishu

Mohamoud had arrived at his home in northern Mogadishu at around 6 p.m. when two men with pistols shot him five times in the head and chest. The shooting occurred in the Wadajir district of the capital. Family members and colleagues believe Hassan was murdered for his efforts to re-establish the radio broadcast station. No group took immediate responsibility for his murder.

=== Context ===
This was the second murder of a journalist in Mogadishu that year and the 29th since 2007, in a country that is considered one of the most dangerous places for journalists to work. Following his death, the NUSOJ repeated its call for an Independent Commission of Enquiry into the murder of Somali journalists to address the widespread culture of impunity surrounding the death of journalists.

== Reactions ==
Irina Bokova, director-general of UNESCO, said, "I am deeply concerned to see that so many Somali journalists and media workers are dying for exercising the fundamental human right of freedom of expression and their professional obligation to inform the public. Letting such murders go unpunished only encourages their perpetrators to continue using violence to repress debate."

Omar Faruk Osman, who represents the International Federation of Journalists said, "This murder of Abukar Hassan Mohamoud is another tragedy and continues to further undermine freedom of expression and freedom of the press in Somalia. Those who continue to murder journalists must be brought to justice, lest fear cripple both the media community and the people of Somalia who rely on journalists for the news and information."

Mohamed Ibrahim, who is secretary general of the National Union of Somali Journalists, said, "(Mohamoud) was planning to bring the radio on air again. The reason is yet unclear, though he was very involved in civil society activism, such as youth in Banadir region in recent days. This is a really worrying trend for the journalists working in Mogadishu and the government has not done enough to investigate and bring suspects for prosecution." He further said, "This murder is the latest example of the extraordinary violence to which journalists are exposed in Somalia. Indifference to the fate of Somali journalists must stop. We reiterate our call for an independent international commission of enquiry into crimes against journalists in this country."

Henry Bellingham, UK Minister for Africa, said, "Sadly this shocking murder is yet another example of the ongoing intimidation of journalists in Somalia."

== See also ==
- List of journalists killed during the Somali civil war
