= Death of Noramfaizul Mohd Nor =

First Malaysian journalist to be fatally injured abroad

- Part of the Horn of Africa conflicts
- Location: Mogadishu, Somalia
- Date: 2 September 2011
- Deaths: 1
- Injuries: 1

Noramfaizul Mohd Nor was the first journalist from Malaysia to be fatally injured while on a dangerous assignment abroad. The attack occurred on 2 September 2011 in Mogadishu, Somalia, while Noramfaizul was reporting for Bernama TV on a humanitarian mission organised by the Islamic charity Kelab Putera 1Malaysia. An AMISOM investigation later concluded that he was accidentally killed by one of its peacekeepers while travelling in a Malaysian convoy.

== Background ==
Prior to joining Bernama TV, Noramfaizul had worked for the National Film of Malaysia, and later Metrovision as a camera operator. While at National Film, he was assigned an aerial photography task and declined to do the job when other camera operators volunteered. The plane ended up crashing and killed the pilot and two cameramen. He then left Filem Negara for Metrovision.

Noramfaizul worked for Bernama as a camera operator since 2002. Bernama is the Malaysia's national news agency and is headquartered in Kuala Lumpur, Malaysia. He worked for Bernama TV when it began as a separate service in 2008. Following his death, Noramfaizul is survived by his wife and two sons.

== Incident ==
In September 2011, Islamic charity Kelab Putera 1Malaysia, also known as Putera 1Malaysia Club, mobilised humanitarian efforts to assist people in the coastal Benadir region of Somalia impacted by the 2011 East Africa drought. Noramfaizul Mohd Nor, a journalist and camera operator with Bernama, Malaysia's national news agency, was assigned to report on these efforts.

At the time of the incident, Noramfaizul was travelling with other journalists, back to their base at the airport. While stopped at the busy Kilometer Four intersection in the capital city of Mogadishu, Noramfaizul was fatally injured when he was shot by a high-caliber bullet, fired by an unknown sniper. Aji Saregar Mazlan, a camera operator for TV3, was sitting to the left of Noramfaizul in the vehicle and was injured in the same incident. The team had been scheduled to travel home on the following weekend.

== Investigation ==
A senior African Union Mission to Somalia (AMISOM) official told the press that "there was a shooting today involving AMISOM, in which a journalist was killed, but the details are not clear at present of how it happened." The Transitional Federal Government of Somalia's Interior and National Security Minister, Abdisamad Maallin Mohamud, similarly indicated that "this (shooting) didn't come from the government ... didn't come from Al-Shabaab (Islamist group)." He also pledged to investigate the incident and submit a detailed report of the findings to the Malaysian authorities. Additionally, the Committee to Protect Journalists urged AMISOM to assure the safety of civilians working in Somalia. The AU indicated that it was in the process of investigating the incident in conjunction with the Somali government, and that "appropriate action will be taken against any soldiers found to have acted improperly."

AMISOM's investigation concluded that four of its peacekeepers from Burundi were implicated in the shooting. The internal board of enquiry proposed that the soldiers should be returned to their home country for military and judicial trial. At the committee's recommendation, the soldiers were also suspended.

== Impact ==
Noramfaizul was the first Malaysian journalist to die in a conflict zone. He had previously covered other humanitarian missions to Gaza and Pakistan.

The Committee to Protect Journalists (CPJ) listed Noramfaizul as the 35th journalist confirmed killed while reporting in Somalia since 1992, while it noted that two reporters operating during that period were still unconfirmed. According to the same source, the deadliest year for journalists working in the country was in 2009, when nine journalists were killed.

Reporters Without Borders (RSF) released a statement about Noramfaizul's death indicating that he had "join[ed] the long list of journalists killed in the course of their work in Somalia". The capital was at the time in the grips of an Islamist insurgency by the Al-Shabaab militant group. A spokesperson for the International Federation of Journalists also criticised employers for sending journalists to work under such potentially dangerous circumstances.

In response to controversy in Malaysia over Noramfaizul's death, the Human Resources Ministry of Malaysia announced it would work with media to develop guidelines for media personnel who work in high risk areas. Noramfaizul's death was cause for controversy in Malaysia because people questioned whether the Putera 1Malaysia Club had adequately warned the 55 people in the mission, which included volunteers, doctors, air force personnel and media workers, about the dangers and whether journalists were being adequately protected while reporting in such situations.

== Reactions ==
=== Press response ===
Datuk Abdul Azeez Abdul Rahim, president of the Putera 1Malaysia Club, said, "His death will be recorded in the Bernama's annals as a selfless and heroic sacrifice of a true professional not only in the course of his duty but also in the genuine pursuit of humanitarian value."

Datuk Yong Soo Heong, editor-in-chief at Bernama, said, "This is a huge loss for Bernama because he was a committed person and never neglected his duty. He had always shown a high level of professionalism in his work."

=== Passengers ===
Tan Su Lin, a journalist for Astro Awani was sitting in front of Noramfaizul on the front, right-hand corner of the four-wheel-drive vehicle. She remembered this about her colleague, "I always (emphasis from original) teased him and called him ketua darjah (class monitor) as he had a way of keeping everyone in line. I didn't expect it to end this way."

Also sitting in the front seat in the middle between the driver (left) and Tan (right) was TV journalist Khairulanuar Yahaya. He has so far said that he cannot believe his fellow worker at Bernama TV was killed.

Melissa Ong, TV journalist from NTV7, sat in the same vehicle with Noramfaizul when he was shot. She was positioned in the back seat to the left of Aji (middle) and Noramfaizul (far right). Ong shared this about Noramfaizul, "Our last memory of him was the laughter we shared in the car before the short journey back to our hostel. I will always treasure that. I believe Abang Faizul would want us to continue our good work in Somalia and I would like to return to set up an IDP camp in his honour." "Abang" is a respectful, affectionate term, which means "older brother."

=== Public ===
Noramfaizul was given a hero's burial at Universiti Putra Malaysia's Muslim cemetery in Serdang, Selangor, Malaysia, which is outside of Kuala Lumpur. In Malaysia, a T-shirt was made as a memorial keepsake that read, "Noramfaizul anda wira kami," which is translated, "Noramfaizul, you are our hero" with "Bernama TV" above the pocket area of the shirt.

== After incident ==
Malacca Governor Tun Mohd Khalil Yaakob, during his 73rd birthday investiture ceremony, conferred on Normafaizul the posthumous Gallantry Star of Malacca (BGP). His spouse, Norazrina Jaafar, received the posthumous award on behalf of her late husband. She thanked the Government of Malacca, Malaysia, for recognising her husband as a "war hero". Noramfaizul Mohd Nor is the first recipient of the BGP award since it was created in 1978.

== See also ==
- List of journalists killed during the Somali civil war
