= Hindia Haji Mohamed =

Somali journalist (1988-2015)

- Born: ca. 1988
- Died: December 3, 2015 (age 27); Mogadishu, Somalia
- Cause of death: Car bomb
- Occupation: Journalist
- Employer(s): Radio Mogadishu and Somali National TV
- Spouse: Liban Ali Nur (d. 2012)

Hindia Haji Mohamed, (ca. 1988 – December 3, 2015), a Somali broadcast radio and TV journalist and producer for Radio Mogadishu and Somali National Television in Mogadishu, Somalia, was one of the many journalists killed during the Somali Civil War. She and her husband Liban Ali Nur were both among the assassinated journalists making them among the few married couples worldwide killed.

== Personal ==
Mohamed was a mother to five children. She was married to Liban Ali Nur, who was also a journalist in Somalia. In 2012, Mohamed's husband was killed in a suicide bombing at a restaurant in Mogadishu along with 14 others and injuring around 20 more. Mohamed was taking classes at the Somali International University and studying International Relations and Diplomacy. She was 27 years old at the time of her murder and she was buried in Mogadishu.

== Career ==
Hindia was a female broadcast journalist for Radio Mogadishu and TV producer for Somali National Television.

== Death ==
Mohamed was killed in a car bombing on December 3, 2015. Mohamed was on her way home from Somali International University (SIU). The bomb was planted under her seat and was remote control activated when it detonated. She was rushed to the hospital because of wounds but died not too long after her arrival. The bomb was detonated outside the Turkish Embassy in Mogadishu.

The group who claimed responsibility for the attack was the Al-Shabaab. Two members of this group were convicted of murdering Mohamed. Abdirisack Mohamed Barrow and Hassan Nur Ali Farah were executed by firing squad. Four other men were also convicted. Moalim Mohamed Abukar and Mohamed Sheikh Yussuf both received life sentences following the attack and still two others received 10 to 15-year prison sentences. These men were part of the group Al-Shabaab.

Mentioned locations in Somalia in relation to Mogadishu.

== Context ==
Somalia is a dangerous country for journalists. Reporters Without Borders rank Somalia on the "Press Freedom Index" as 172 out of 180 countries for press freedom. Mohamed was the 38th journalist to be killed there since 2010. Journalists in Somalia are subject to frequent attacks, kidnappings and intimidation. Somalia also has strict media restrictions, as well as heavy fines for violations. Some journalists in Somalia have been forced to flee the country. There are limited resources devoted to ensuring the safety of journalists safe, which makes them targets during the civil war.

== Reactions ==
Irina Bokova, the director general of the United Nations Educational, Scientific, and Cultural Organization, said, "I condemn the killing of Hindiya Haji Mohamed. Pluralistic and independent media are vital to freedom of expression and cannot operate without the dedicated work of journalists. It is essential for Somali society as a whole that the perpetrators of this crime are brought to justice."

Omar Frank Osman, secretary of NUSOJ, said, "We all mourn this disastrous assassination of Hindiyo Haji Mohamed which is another reminder of the risks Somali journalists continue to face regularly. This was targeted killing, deliberately meant to eliminate Hindiyo. Those who deliberately seek to harm unsuspecting members of the public, including journalists, need to be condemned and hunted down to answer for their actions."

== See also ==
- List of journalists killed during the Somali civil war
- Murder of Sagar Sarowar and Meherun Runi, another married couple killed for their journalism
- 2015 timeline of the War in Somalia
