= Barkhad Awale Adan =

- Born: 1950? Borama, Somaliland
- Died: 24 August 2010; Mogadishu, Somalia
- Other names: Barkhat Awale
- Occupations: Director, Radio Hurma

Barkhad Awale Adan, also spelled Burkhat, (Somali: Barkhad Cawaale Aadan) was a Somali journalist. He was the Director of Radio Hurma, based in Mogadishu, Somalia. He was killed in 2010 by a stray bullet during intensive fighting between Al-Shabaab militants and AMISOM soldiers in the Battle of Mogadishu.

== Life and career ==
Adan was born in Borama in Somaliland. He was married, with three children.

Adan was a veteran who had worked for 30 years in Mogadishu's radio industry. He had been working at Radio Hurma for 4 years.

== Death ==
On 24 August 2010, AMISOM forces were battling Al-Shabaab rebels in Mogadishu, after a suicide bombing attack earlier in the day on the Hotel Muna killed at least 33 people. Awale was helping a technician repair his radio station's roof transmitter when he was struck in the abdomen by a stray crossfire bullet. He was rushed to the Madina hospital, where he was later pronounced dead.

Adan became the second journalist in Somalia to die in 2010, a year after the country had experienced its deadliest year for journalists up to that point, according to the Committee to Protect Journalists.

== Reactions ==
Faruk Osman, Secretary General of the National Union of Somali Journalists, said at the time of Adan's death: "The violence in Mogadishu has made it extremely dangerous for media professionals to carry out their work without falling victims to the ever flying bullets and widespread criminality. We have lost, yet again, another veteran journalist courtesy of the raging hostilities."

Gabriel Baglo, Director of International Federation of Journalists' Africa Office, also stated: "This killing demonstrates again that journalists in Somalia are being targeted by gangs and militias in the country. The authorities must take concrete and urgent measures to protect journalists doing their work and innocent civilians in general."

Additionally, Irina Bokova, Director General of UNESCO, said: "The Somali press is paying an exorbitant price for the instability prevailing in the country. Combatants must respect journalists’ immunity. Without it, without security, no freedom of expression worthy of the name can exist, even though it is a fundamental human right."

== See also ==
- List of journalists killed during the Somali civil war
