= Abukar Arman =

Somali political analyst, writer, former diplomat

Abukar Arman أبوبكر أرمان
- Born: Somalia
- Occupations: Political analyst, writer, diplomat
- Title: Mr

Abukar Arman (Somali: abukar Carman, Arabic: أبوبكر أرمان) is a Somali political analyst, writer and former Special Envoy to the United States. Arman is also a widely published foreign policy specialist, writing extensively on Somalia and international political affairs.
