= Maryam Mursal =

Maryam Mursal مريم مرسل
- Born: Maryan Mursal; 1 January 1950 (age 76); Somalia
- Genres: Somali music
- Instruments: vocals, composer
- Years active: 1965s–present
- Label: Real World Records

Maryam Mursal (Somali: Maryan Mursal, Arabic: مريم مرسل) (born 1 January 1950) is a Somali composer and vocalist.

== Biography ==
Mursal grew up in Somaliland in a Muslim family with four daughters. Mursal's family was originally from Somaliland,Boorama

As a teenager, she broke with tradition and began singing professionally in Mogadishu. She performed in nightclubs and her brand of music, featuring a mix of blues, soul, Somali and Arabic influences, known as Somali jazz, became popular across the country. Performing primarily solo, she also collaborated with Waaberi, a 300-member music and dance troupe associated with the Somali National Theatre. Later, after having criticized Somalia's then ruling military government, she was banned from singing for two years, and made her living driving a taxi.

During the subsequent civil war in her homeland, Mursal and her five children moved to neighboring Djibouti, where she found asylum in the Danish embassy. It was this odyssey that provided the gem of her solo recording The Journey, with guitars, sequencers and back-up vocals from Peter Gabriel.

Mursal still lives abroad, now residing in US. She has toured Europe with Waaberi and appeared with Nina Simone. Her work has been produced by Peter Gabriel's Real World record label.

== Discography ==
- New Dawn album
- The Journey
- Indho caashaq (love eyes)
- 1964 first song

== Quotes ==
- "Traditional music is very important to me but I was also listening to people like Ray Charles, The Beatles, everything."
- "We as artists are responsible if something wrong is taking place in our society. It's very important for us to speak up, even though we may have to do it with a double tongue. We have to speak out for our people."
- "I was always the first woman. I was the first woman singing Somali jazz, I was the first star, and I was the first to drive a taxi! I was the first to drive a lorry, and now I'm the first woman from Somalia to have an international record."

== See also ==
- Waaberi
- Radio Mogadishu
- Music of Somalia
- Mohamed Sulayman Tubeec
