= Waaberi =

Somali musical group

Waaberi وابري
- Origin: Mogadishu
- Genres: Somali music
- Occupations: Singer, dancer
- Instruments: Vocals, guitar, oud, tambura
- Years active: 1960s–1990s
- Past members: Ali Feiruz; Hasan Adan Samatar; Magool; Maryam Mursal

Waaberi (Somali: Waaberi) was a Somali musical supergroup.

== History ==
The troupe was established by members of the Radio Artists Association. It was supported by the Somali government as part of the National Theatre of Somalia, and toured several countries in Africa, including Egypt and Sudan, and also performed in the People's Republic of China. After a coup in 1969, the ensemble was renamed Waaberi, which means "sunrise". The group continued to exist as a private organization into the 1990s.

Vocalist Maryam Mursal, the first woman to play Somali jazz, was a member of the ensemble. After performing at the English WOMAD festival in 1997, the group toured North America in 1998, and recorded an album with Egyptian musician Hossam Ramzy.

== See also ==
- Music of Somalia
- Radio Mogadishu
