= Sagal Salad Osman =

- Sagal Salad Osman
- Born: ca. 1992
- Died: June 5, 2016 (aged 24); Mogadishu, Somalia
- Cause of death: Gunshot wounds
- Body discovered: Outside a university in Mogadishu’s northwestern neighborhood of Hodan
- Education: Plasma University
- Occupations: Broadcast journalist and producer
- Years active: 4 years
- Employer(s): Radio Mogadishu and Somali National Television
- Known for: youth empowerment
- Television: Somali National Television
- Father: Salad Osman
- Family: six siblings

Sagal Salad Osman, also known as Sagal Osman, (ca. 1992 – June 5, 2016), a Somali producer and journalist for Radio Mogadishu in Mogadishu, Somalia, was the second female journalist killed within six months in Somalia, one of the most deadly countries for journalists. It is believed that Al-Shabaab, a militant group who is connected to Al-Qaeda, is responsible for her death.

== Personal ==
Sagal Salad Osman, daughter of the former Somali Youth Organization president Salad Osman, was a 24-year-old journalist. Osman was a student at Plasma University, where she was studying computer science. After her mother had died, she took care of her six siblings.

== Career ==
Osman worked as a presenter and producer at a state-run Radio Mogadishu. She was also a broadcaster for Somali National Television. Before she was killed, Osman was a television producer and news anchor.

== Death ==
On Sunday, June 5, 2016, Osman had just finished a meeting to prepare for her final exam and went with her friends to a restaurant away from Plasma University, when she was murdered at around 3:30 pm. She was gunned down by three unidentified armed men with a pistol outside the front gate of her university in Mogadishu's northwestern neighborhood of Hodan. She was rushed to the hospital, but died on the way. Many of her colleagues went to identify her body. According to Ali Abdulkadir, "they had no idea why Osman was killed". Somali security forces collected her body from the scene. The police heard the gunshots from where Osman was shot and rushed to the scene. By the time they got there, the gunmen had already escaped. No one was ever arrested for the crime or claimed responsibility for the murder.

== Context ==
Sagal Salad Osman was shot several times in the head and chest in June by three armed men with a pistol in Mogadishu's northwestern neighborhood of Hodan. The men who killed Osman are suspected members a militant group linked to Al-Qaeda called the Shabaab. The police believed that Al-Shabaab was the one behind the killing. She was currently working as a producer and presenter for the state-run Radio Mogadishu station and anchored her career towards youth empowerment by working in television. Journalists who worked in media, like where Osman worked, were frequently targeted by the Shabaab.

== Impact ==
Osman was the first female journalist killed in 2016, but was the second female murdered within six months. Since 1992, there has been more than 60 journalists murdered in Somalia, making it one of the most dangerous countries in the world for media workers. The deadliest year by far for journalist in Somalia has been in 2012 when 18 media workers were killed. Between 2007 and 2015, about 45 Somali journalists were killed.

== Reactions ==
Reporters Without Borders said in their statement, "The government must react to the extraordinary level of terrorism and violence that is consuming Somalia. We ask the authorities to conduct a swift and thorough investigation in order to shed light on this appalling murder and bring those responsible to justice."

Mohamed Ibrahim Moalimuu, secretary general of the National Union of Somali Journalists said, "We condemn in the strongest terms possible, and we call for the government to probe and bring those who were behind the killing to justice." France condemned Osman's murder and said that those responsible for her death must be brought to justice and that this crime must be fully investigated.

== See also ==
- Media of Somalia
- List of Somalis
