= Hos Maina =

Kenyan photojournalist (1955–1993)

- Born: 1 January 1955; Kenya
- Died: 12 July 1993 (aged 38); Mogadishu, Somalia
- Occupation: Photojournalist
- Employer: Reuters

Hosea D. Maina, better known as Hos Maina, was a Kenyan photojournalist killed in Somalia.

Maina was born 1 January 1955 in Kenya. He began his career in the 1970s as a photographer for the sports section of the Daily Nation before becoming a freelancer and joining Reuters in 1988, covering conflicts in Eastern Africa. He was self-taught.

On 12 July 1993, Maina was working in Mogadishu with Hansi Krauss, Dan Eldon, and Anthony Macharia, who were invited to see the outcome of the Bloody Monday raid. Maina had arrived a few days prior to relieve Eldon. As they began to take photographs, the four were attacked by a mob, where Maina was killed alongside the other three journalists. Maina's body was found the next day.

Maina had a wife, Lucy, and multiple children.
