= Magool =

- Born: Halima Khaliif Omar; Xaliimo Khaliif Cumar; May 2, 1948; Dhusamareb, Italian Somaliland
- Died: March 19, 2004 (aged 55) Amsterdam, Netherlands
- Genre: Somali music
- Occupation: musician
- Instrument: vocals
- Years active: 1960s–1990s
- Website: https://somali-music.com/artists/halimo-magool

Magool (Somali: Xaliimo Khaliif Cumar, born Halima Khaliif Omar, May 2, 1948 – March 19, 2004) was a Somali singer.

== Early years ==
Magool was born in the city of Dhuusamareeb, the capital of the Galgaduud region in central Somalia to Cayr, Hawiye parents. She had five siblings.

In 1959, while living at the house of a cousin named Mohamed Hashi, she joined a small Mogadishu-based band. Later the same year, she moved to Hargeysa, where she accompanied that city's version of the Mogadishu-based Waaberi ensemble of musicians. At this time, fellow musician and songwriter Yusuf Haji Adan dubbed her Magool (meaning "flower"), a nickname by which she would come to be popularly known.

In the mid-1960s, Magool returned to Mogadishu. She then married a young general named Mohamed Nur Galaal. The marriage did not last but her popularity continued to rise.

== Peak ==
In the 1970s, Magool sang famous patriotic songs while Somalia was at war with Ethiopia over the Somali Region.

By the late 1970s, while she still interpreted love tunes, Magool also began singing Islamic songs that criticized Somalia's then ruling military government. A self-imposed exile followed, which would last until 1987. Her concert of that year marking her return to the nation's capital, titled "Mogadishu and Magool", is to date the most successful concert in Somali history, with more than 160,000 people reportedly turning out in the city's stadium.

Magool's unique performances, ability to memorize entire albums' worth of material in a matter of hours, and her deep, emotive voice would eventually earn her the title of Hooyadii Fanka, or "Mother of Artistry."

== Popular Songs ==
The following is a selection of songs performed by Somali singer Xaliimo Khaliif Magool, with the lyricist or poet credited where identified. Magool's repertoire included works by many prominent Somali poets, including Hadraawi, Ali Sugulle, Hassan Sheikh Muumin, Hussein Aw-Farah Dubbad, Ahmed Saleban Bidde and others. For example, Shimbiryahow Ma Duushaa? is documented as a Magool recording with lyrics by Mohamed Ibrahim Warsame (Hadraawi) and composition by Abdikariim Ahmed “Jiir.”

1. Kii Dhab ah Jacaylkuna — lyrics by Hussein Aw-Farah Dubbad

2. Shimbiryahow Ma Duushaa? — lyrics by Mohamed Ibrahim Warsame (Hadraawi)

3. Shimbirayahow Heesa — lyrics by Hassan Sheikh Muumin

4. Xalay Daruustii Lay Dhigay — lyrics by Ahmed Saleban Bidde

5. Waa Qaali Malabkuye — lyrics by Hassan Sheikh Muumin

6. Af-Qalaad Aqoontu Miyaa? — lyrics by Ali Sugulle (Dun-carbeed)

7. Maxaad Taqaan? — lyrics by Ali Sugulle (Dun-carbeed)

8. Nin Lagu Seedow Ha Seexan — lyrics by Ali Sugulle (Dun-carbeed)

9. Wabiyaal Isu Ooman — lyrics by Hussein Aw-Farah Dubbad

10. Soomaali Dhooylaay — lyrics by Hussein Aw-Farah Dubbad

11. Ubax La Moodiyoow — lyrics by Sahardiid Jabiye

12. Maanta, Maanta, Maanta — lyrics by Ali Sugulle (Dun-carbeed)

13. Caashaqa Ha Baayicin — lyrics by Xasan Ganey

14. Dookh (Dalsankii Wariiriyo) — with Hassan Adan Samatar; lyrics by Xasan Ganey

15. Dhab U Fiirso — with Qasaali; lyrics by Mohamed Ibrahim Warsame (Hadraawi)

16. Afrikaay Hurudooy — lyrics by Ismail Hersi Ise (Farhan)

17. Dadnimada Aqooso — with Mohamed Ahmed Kuluc; lyrics by Mohamud Mohamed Yasin (Dheeg)

18. Ma Salguuro Caashaqa — lyrics by Mohamud Mohamed Yasin (Dheeg)

19. Ilwaad Qurux — with A.M. Good Shimbir; lyrics by Sahardiid Jabiye

20. Dhabtuu Jacaylku Aalaa — lyrics by Ahmed Saleban Bidde

21. Qamareey — with Beerdilaacshe; lyrics by Ali Diriye (Ali Gaab)

22. Ayaamaha Nabsigu — lyrics by Sulub Omar Ahmed

23. Indha-Daraandar — with Mohamed Ahmed Kuluc; lyrics by Ali Sugulle (Dun-carbeed)

24. Mininkiina Anigaa Imidee — lyrics by Abdiqadir Ali Egal (Cirro)

== Later years ==
On March 19, 2004, Magool died in a hospital in Amsterdam of breast cancer. She did not leave any children, but her nephew is Abdiweli Kayliye a Somali actor.

== See also ==
- Waaberi
