= Hasan Adan Samatar =

Hasan Adan Samatar حسن ادم سماتر
- Born: hassan Aadan Samatar; May 23, 1953 (age 73); Dinsoor, Bay, Somalia
- Genres: Somali music
- Occupations: musician, actor, performer
- Instruments: vocals, guitar
- Years active: 1970s–present

Hasan Adan Samatar (Somali: Xasan Aadan Samatar, Arabic: حسن اذن ساماتار) (b. May 23, 1953 in Diinsoor, Somalia) is a prominent Somali singer, guitarist and theatrical performer.

== Biography ==
Samatar was born to an artistic family in Dinsoor, Somalia in 1953. He grew up in Baidoa, where he attended primary and elementary schools. He subsequently relocated to Mogadishu, the nation's capital, and began his secondary education.

Samatar's involvement with music began at a very early age, with him first taking up singing during childhood. He later started to play the guitar. While most of Samatar's songs have been in Standard Somali, many of his early tunes were in the Maay dialect. His first mainstream song was "Haddaad diido hadalkayga" in 1974.

After graduating from high school, Samatar planned on attending university in Italy. However, at the behest of friends, he decided to first take part in the 1971 edition of Heesaha Hirgalay, a talent show competition that was at the time Somalia's equivalent of American Idol. Samatar wound up winning the entire contest. He was shortly afterwards inducted into Waaberi, the premier Somali musical ensemble, and emerged as a leader in the local music and theater scenes.

== Theater ==
Samatar has acted in more than two dozen plays, ranging from melodramatic and socially conscious pieces to romantic productions. He is noted for both his performing ability and charismatic style.

== Music ==
Among the most influential and enduring of Somali singers, Samatar has a musical corpus of over 200 songs, and has performed several duets with other popular Somali artists, including Saado Cali, Khadija Qalanjo and Seynab Haji Ali.

Samatar credits his exposure to Somali folklore and cultural festivals at a young age with his artistic achievements:

As a young boy growing up in Diinsoor, I used to go to [the] town center to watch dances and celebrations by townsfolk. These were mesmerizing and I think because of seeing all of that I always wanted to sing and perform.

Samatar also encourages Somali parents in the diaspora to teach their children the rich Somali culture, particularly songs and poetry, so that the youth will appreciate the beauty of their traditions and draw pride from that.

== Awards ==
On August 14, 2010, Samatar received a lifetime achievement award from leaders of the Somali community in Minneapolis. A spokesman for Eagle Media, which had put together the tribute dinner and gala party, indicated that the organization had sought to present Samatar the prize years earlier but was waiting for the artist to return to Minnesota.

== Personal life ==
Samatar now spends his time in between Toronto, Ontario, Canada and Amsterdam, Netherlands, and still continues to tour. He settled down in Djibouti since 2015 and had a new baby with his new wife.

== Popular songs ==
Xasan Aadan Samatar has performed numerous Somali songs throughout his career. Some of his notable recordings include:

1. Baladweyn — lyrics by maxamed Ibrahim Wasame (Hadrawi)

2. Qoraxdoo Aroortii — lyrics by Prof. Shirwac

3. Marka Da'da Jiray 15 — lyrics by Barre Maxamed Fiidow (Leento)

4. Haddaad Diido Hadalkayga — lyrics by Maxamed Cumar Nidaamiye

5. Lulumaha Biyaha Gala (Unknown)

6. Darmaan — with Saado Cali — lyrics by Maxamed Cali Kaariye

7. Dawooy Dawo Caafimaadey — with Sahra Dawo — lyrics by Maxamed Cali Kaariye

8. Bulshayahey Ma Nabad Baa? — lyrics by Maxamed Cali Kaariye

9. Dookh (Dalsankii wariiriyo) with Magool — lyrics by Xasan X. Cabdilaahi (Xasan Ganey)

10. Caashaqa Ha Bayicin with Magool — lyrics by Xasan X. Cabdilaahi (Xasan Ganey)

11. Qalanjo — lyrics by Maxamed Ibraahin Warsame (Hadraawi)

12. Siraadey — lyrics by General Maxamuud Ciise

13. Dabaylaha Rogmanayee — lyrics by Cabdi Aadan (Cabdi Qeys)

14. Hakaba Banaanshee (hees lahjada maayga) — lyrics by Sahal Macallin Ciise

15. Iyooyow iyooyow (hees lahjada maayga) — lyrics by Sahal Macallin Ciise

== See also ==
- Waaberi
