= Capital Voice =

Radio station in Mogadishu, Somalia

Capital Voice was a private radio station based in Mogadishu, Somalia. It was part of the HornAfrik Media Inc network, which also operated another radio station, a television station, a website and a training research center.
