= Bernama TV =

Malaysian news television network

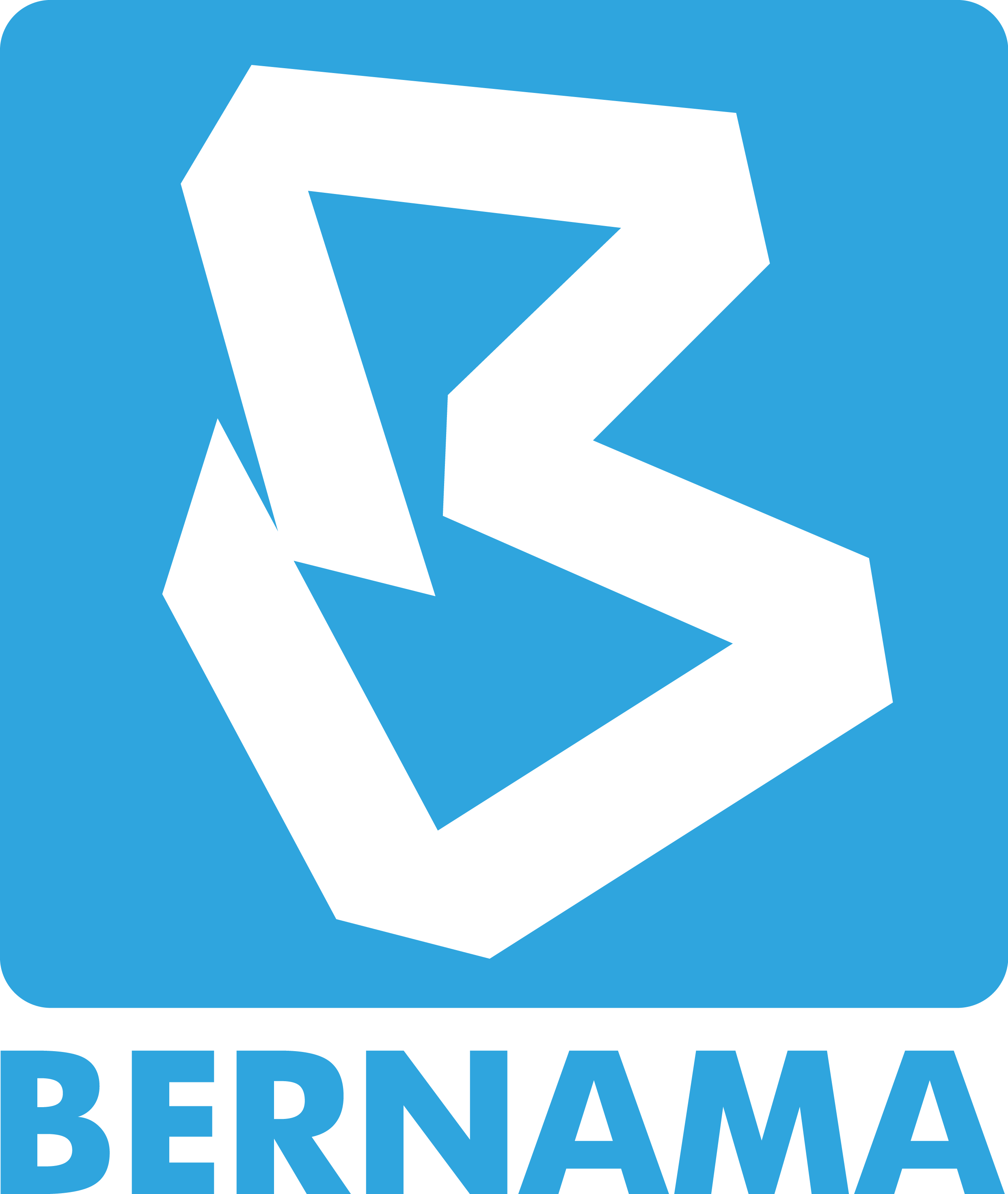
- Country: Malaysia
- Broadcast area: Malaysia; Singapore; Brunei; Thailand (South Thailand, particularly Songkhla, Narathiwat, Yala and Satun); Philippines (Balabac, Palawan and Tawi-Tawi); Indonesia (West Kalimantan, Riau Islands, North Kalimantan and Riau)

Programming
- Languages: Malay; English; Mandarin; Tamil
- Picture format: 1080i (16:9/HDTV)

Ownership
- Owner: BERNAMA

History
- Launched: 28 February 2008; 18 years ago; 8 October 2021; 4 years ago (MYTV) (HD)
- Closed: 7 October 2021; 4 years ago (MYTV) (SD)
- Former names: Bernama News Channel (25 May 2016 – 9 October 2019)

Links
- Website: www.bernama.com/tv

Availability

Terrestrial
- MYTV: Channel 121 (HD)

Bernama TV (known briefly as Bernama News Channel from 2016 to 2019) is a Malaysian free-to-air news television network. Launched on 28 February 2008, it is owned by Bernama, a government news agency. It airs news programmes that are related to local and international business, lifestyle, sports and entertainment as well as in-house programmes.

Alongside its main focus as a Malay-language news television channel, Bernama TV also produces news and current affairs content in Malaysia's other official languages of English, Chinese, and Tamil across its platforms. It can be viewed nationwide on MYTV Channel 121, Astro Channel 502 and Unifi TV Channel 631.

== History ==
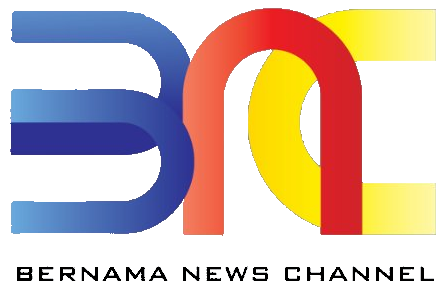
Logo briefly used by the channel from 2016 to 2019.

Bernama had wanted to operate its own TV channel in 1996, but was rejected; instead the government recommended to produce video news items similar to Reuters. However, in 2008, Bernama's proposal to have its own channel was tabled on cabinet.

Bernama TV was launched in 1998 and began broadcasting on 28 February 2008. Like Radio Televisyen Malaysia's television channels, Bernama TV have some amount of commercial advertising. Its news bulletins were initially aired on Astro Ria, Astro Prima, Astro AEC, Astro Wah Lai Toi and Astro Vaanavil, but they have since been integrated to one Astro network. Its news content is primarily broadcast in Malay. However, there are also news bulletin in English, Mandarin, and Tamil since 2018. Other shows that are broadcast on Bernama TV are flagship talk-shows like Malay-medium Ruang Bicara as well as English-medium The Nation and The Brief.

In the years that followed, Bernama TV established its name through its coverage of key events in Malaysia including the Lahad Datu standoff, the 1Malaysia Development Berhad scandal and the Sri Maha Mariamman Temple riot.

In 2009, Bernama TV faced financial difficulties when it accumulated losses over RM15 million and would cease broadcasting soon, pending a restructuring plan. This prompted Bernama to look for potential buyers who were interested in buying the channel.

In 2011, Bernama TV's news management were placed under the Information Ministry.

In 2015, the Ministry of Finance granted an allocation to Bernama TV to allowed it resume operations and refurbish its technical equipment.

On 25 May 2016, Bernama TV went into a major rebrand by rebranding itself as Bernama News Channel (BNC), only to quietly revert to its original logo and name in October 2019. The staff were offered a contract with Gem Bytes Sdn Bhd on 14th day of the same month and year.

In 2018, Bernama News Channel partnered with iflix where Bernama's news telecast aired on the streaming platform. In 2019, BNC partnered with the Malaysian Communications and Multimedia Commission to strengthening its communication activities.

In January 2021, Bernama TV became the second television station after RTM, where it began to use sign language interpreter for its news broadcasts.

On 8 October 2021 from 12:00 am onwards, Bernama TV switch to broadcasting in HD format.

In 2021, Bernama TV garnered a total of 73 million from viewership on its social media platform. As of May 2022, its viewership increased to 78 million.

== Ownership structure ==
Bernama holds minority shareholder in Bernama TV with 33% stake, which operated by its former operating company, Bernama TV Synergy. Other shareholders were Silver Ridge Multimedia and Standard Code who holds 30% of stake in the channel respectively and Hallmark Media division of Hallmark Cards only holds 7%.

== Programming ==
The programming of Bernama TV is focused primarily on news, business, and politics with weather updates, sports news, informative, religious and lifestyle programs as secondary contents. The network also shows documentaries and television specials. Bernama TV is one of the two Malaysian television news channel broadcast in 4 languages, namely Malay, English, Tamil and Mandarin. The other being Berita RTM, a news channel owned and operated by Radio Televisyen Malaysia.

== Incidents ==
Noramfaizul Mohd Nor worked for Bernama TV as a TV camera operator when he was killed 2 September 2011 covering a humanitarian mission to Somalia. He was the first Malaysian journalist to be killed while on assignment abroad.

== Awards and accolades ==
Year	Award-giving body	Category	Recipient	Result	Ref.
2023	The Knights Award 2023	The Rapid News Distribution of All Time (Malaysia)	Bernama TV	Won	

== See also ==
- Berita RTM
- Astro Awani
