= HornAfrik =

Media organization based in Mogadishu, Somalia

HornAfrik Media Inc.
- Company type: Website, Radio and Television
- Industry: Broadcasting
- Genre: News
- Founded: 12 December 1999
- Founder: Ahmed Abdisalam, Mohamed Elmi, Ali Iman Sharmarke
- Defunct: 2010
- Headquarters: Mogadishu, Somalia
- Products: www.hornafrik.com
- Number of employees: 50-100
- Website: www.hornafrik.com

HornAfrik was a media organization based in Mogadishu, Somalia. Prior to its closure in 2010, it was the first independent radio network to have its headquarters in the city. HornAfrik operated Radio HornAfrik, as well as one other radio station, a television station, a website and a training research center.

== History ==
HornAfrik.net was established in 1999 by, Mohamed Elmi and Ali Iman Sharmarke, three Somali emigrants to Canada who arrived after the start of the civil war in their country of birth. They later returned to Mogadishu following a period of relative calm in order to finalize market research that they had conducted on the feasibility and technological equipment necessary to start a new media company in the city. Concluding that the project was workable, HornAfrik was subsequently officially opened on 12 December 1999.

Prior to the Somali Army's pacification of Mogadishu in August 2011, HornAfrik operated from a temporary premises in the capital. The network's transmissions of international segments earned it criticism from religious fundamentalists, with the Al-Shabaab militant group routinely launching attacks against the company and its staff. HornAfrik's co-founder Sharmarke was among those killed in 2007, at the height of this Islamist insurgency in southern Somalia. Despite the threats of violence, HornAfrik persevered and continued to air outside programs.

In 2008, HornAfrik celebrated its ninth anniversary. It permanently closed down operations the following year.

== Programs and services ==
HornAfrik.net broadasted 18 hours daily. Besides Mogadishu, its FM transmissions reached several other regions in the nation. They could also be heard in other parts of the continent via satellite, as well as in Europe, Asia and Australia. Worldwide, the network's broadcasts were accessible through the internet.

HornAfrik.net ran a number of popular call-in programs. These segments allowed residents of Mogadishu and the surrounding area to share their views on various issues of local interest, including topics related to culture, health, religion, peace, education and economy. In the past, the network also used to air interviews with faction leaders who at the time controlled parts of the city.

Additionally, HornAfrik broadcast Somali language programming from the BBC and Voice of America. It also engaged in some philanthropic work.

== Network ==
The HornAfrik media network consisted of Radio HornAfrik, as well as the Capital Voice private radio station. It also included a television station, HornAfrik TV, in addition to a website and a training research center.

According to MENASSAT, the Arab world media resource, HornAfrik TV during its existence operated six channels in Somali and Arabic, the two official languages of Somalia.

== Awards ==
In 2002, the Somali-Canadian founders of HornAfrik were honored as the winners of the Canadian Journalists for Free Expression (CJFE's) International Press Freedom Award. HornAfrik was presented the award for its work in the face of threats and intimidation at a time when there was no effective legal recourse or protection for the local press.

In 2007, the late Ali Sharmarke was also posthumously awarded the Tara Singh Hayer Award by the CJFE for his courage in the field of journalism. His 11-year-old son Liban accepted the prize on his behalf.

== See also ==
- Attacks on HornAfrik Media Inc.
