= National Union of Somali Journalists =

National Union of Somali Journalists (NUSOJ)
- Trade name: National Union of Somali Journalists (NUSOJ)
- Native name: Ururka Qaranka Suxufiyiinta Soomaaliyeed
- Industry: Journalists' Union
- Headquarters: Mogadishu, Somalia
- Key people: Omar Faruk Osman - Secretary General. Farah Mohamed Yusuf - Treasurer

The National Union of Somali Journalists (NUSOJ) was set up in August 2002 as an association called Somali Journalists Network (SOJON) to promote and protect freedom of the press and the interests of journalists after the former Transitional National Government of Somalia prepared and approved a repressive media law. In order to effectively fight for journalists’ pay and conditions, their working rights and their professional freedom, the members of the organisation in their 2005 General Assembly in Mogadishu resolved to transform the organisation from an Association to a trade union with a new Name: the National Union of Somali Journalists (NUSOJ). The organisation was formally dedicated for the purpose of serving the member journalists’ interests and needs with respect to journalists’ rights, press freedom and working conditions.

The National Union of Somali Journalists, an affiliate of the International Federation of Journalists (IFJ), is a national trade union organisation representing over 650 of Somalia’s 1000 journalists, who established or joined the union in order to uphold and defend their interests, needs and rights cooperatively and deal with employers, authorities and other sectors in the society collectively. NUSOJ is a fervent champion for media freedom, the rights of journalists, workers’ rights and for social justice in Somalia. Member journalists work across the whole industry as reporters, editors and sub-editors and photographers. Members work in broadcasting, newspapers, magazines, and in the new media (news websites). NUSOJ members come from many different families and backgrounds, with widely different regions of Somalia.

Due to egregious violations of human and trade unions against NUSOJ members and leadership, NUSOJ lodged a complaint on freedom of association at the International Labour Organisation (ILO) which urged the government of Somalia to end the attacks against NUSOJ and its members. UN human rights experts equally spoke out and condemned attacks against NUSOJ. The European Parliament had unanimously passed a resolution which called for the protection of human rights in Somalia, specially the rights of NUSOJ members and the end of the attacks on journalists.
