= Somali literature =

Somali literature is the literature used by the ethnic Somalis of Somalia, Djibouti, Yemen, Eritrea, Ethiopia, and Kenya.

== Somali poetry ==
=== Nation of Bards ===
Due to the Somali people's passionate love for and facility with poetry, Somalia has also been called by, among others, the Canadian novelist and scholar Margaret Laurence, a "Nation of Poets" and a "Nation of Bards". The 19th-century British explorer Richard Francis Burton, who visited the Somali Peninsula, similarly recounts in his book First Footsteps in East Africa how:

The country teems with poets... every man has his recognized position in literature as accurately defined as though he had been reviewed in a century of magazines - the fine ear of this people causing them to take the greatest pleasure in harmonious sounds and poetic expressions ... Every chief in the country must have a panegyric to be sung by his clan, and the great patronize light literature by keeping a poet.

According to Canadian novelist and scholar Margaret Laurence, who originally coined the term "Nation of Poets" to describe the Somali Peninsular, the Eidagale sub-section of the Garhajis clan were viewed as "the recognized experts in the composition of poetry" by their fellow Somali contemporaries:

Among the tribes, the Eidagalla are the recognized experts in the composition of poetry. One individual poet of the Eidagalla may be no better than a good poet of another tribe, but the Eidagalla appear to have more poets than any other tribe. "if you had a hundred Eidagalla men here," Hersi Jama once told me, "And asked which of them could sing his own gabei ninety-five would be able to sing. The others would still be learning."

=== Structure ===
Somali poetry features obligatory alliteration, similar in some respects to the requirements of Germanic alliterative verse. There is a crucial distinction between the different forms of Somali poetry. The forms differ by number of syllables in each verse of poem.

Form	Syllables	Metre
Halaanhal	12	Oldest metre
Gabay	14 to 16	Classical metre
Geeraar	7	Classical metre
Jiifto	7	Classical metre
Heello	10	
Hees-xoolaad (livestock-song)	4 to 5	
Hees-cayaareed (dance-song)	6 to 11	
Hees-caanood (milk-shaking song)	6 to 9	
Hees-mooye (grinding-song)	6	
Hees-carruureed (children-song)	8	

=== Muhammad Abdullah Hassan ===
Observing that "some say he was 'peerless' and his 'noble lines' .. are commonly quoted throughout the Somali peninsula", Samatar concurs with J. Spencer Trimingham's judgement that "Mahammad 'Abdille Hasan [Sayyid Abdullah Hassan] was a master of eloquence and excelled in the art of composing impromptu poems which so readily inspire and inflame the Somalis"—although Samatar dissents on its "impromptu" nature.

One of Hassan's well-known poems is Gaala Leged ("Defeat of the Infidels"):

English translation

To begin with, I had neglected poetry and had let it dry up
I had sent it west in the beginning of the spring rains.
But let me set forth what prevented me from sleeping last night

God's Blessing are more numerous than those growing trees.
I will remind you of the victory he gave us
Listen to me my council, for you are most dear to me

If the unwashed left handed one had died yesterday,
if I had cut his throat- may he taste hell in the grave itself
And the wild animals had eaten him, he and his ilk would deserve this

I would salute the hyena that would gorge itself on his flesh, as it's doing me a favor, it is dearer to me than any other animal of the wild.
If could I would reward it every day

That deformed one wasted a lot of my wealth
since he kept committing wrongs again and again
I knew all along that the hyena would devour him

It was their insincere refusal to acknowledge the truth that put them down and destroyed them
And made me attack their best man with a Dagger

If they had not become ungrateful, I would have not become enraged with them
I would have not lost my generosity and respect for them
I would have not have withheld anything from them, if they desired peace

But when they acted disdainfully, death marched straight at them

=== Elmi Boodhari ===
Elmi Boodhari differed from the poets of his generation in that he eschewed the popular theme of Tribal war and vengeance in Somali poetry, instead wholly focusing on love and composing all his poems for the woman he loved, Hodan Abdulle, which was seen as highly unconventional and scandalous at the time.

Author Mohamed Diiriye in his book Culture and Customs of Somalia, writes:

Among the poets of the past century, a poet who has gained the hearts of all Somalis in every district is Elmi Boodhari, many major poets such as Mohamed Abdallah Hassan and Abdi Gahayr, aroused resentment among some somalis, as they addressed diatribes against the members of a certain clan, or urged bloodletting; such poets are known as viper tongues, and the poems of such poets have been known to cause feuds and clan wars. But not so with Elmi Boodhari, his subject was romance and only that. While the poets of his day where addressing serious subjects such as war and feuds, Boodhari composed all of his poems for the lady of his affection Hodan, who was given in hand of marriage to a man much wealthier than him. Instead of getting literary kudos for his beautiful verse, Boodhari was made the object of public ridicule. Somali society had not been of course devoid of romance either in song or prose in any age, but to proclaim the object of ones love was frowned upon in the social mores of Somalis.

A poem Elmi composed for Hodan:

She is altogether fair:

Her fine-shaped bones begin her excellence;

Magnificent of bearing, tall is she; A proud grace is her body's greatest splendor; Yet she is gentle, womanly, soft of skin. Her gums' dark gloss is like unto blackest ink; And a careless flickering of her slanted eyes Begets a light clear as the white spring moon. My heart leaps when I see her walking by, Infinite suppleness in her body's sway. I often fear that some malicious djinn

May envy her beauty, and wish to do her harm.

— From "Qaraami" (Passion), as presented by Margaret Laurence in A Tree for Poverty.

=== Ali Bu'ul ===
Ali Bu'ul (Cali Bucul) was a famous Somali poet and military leader from the 19th century renown for his geeraars. Geeraars are mostly used to praise the Horse, since horse stood central in a Somali pastoral life as a means of transportation and waging war. Equestrian poems were the hype before the early 20th century and many of the well known geeraars we know today come from Ali Bu'ul. He coined the term Guulwade, which Somalis still use up to this day and especially during Somalia's revolutionary council years

Here is an extract from one of his famous geeraar's Guulside (Victory-Bearer):

O my horse Guulside!

If his goodness

And his nature I try to describe,

He is a pool that refills itself

And I cannot plumb his secret.

I fall short.

Tell me, people, am I at fault?

The slopes of Mount Almis

And the Haraw ravine,

The camps on Mount Gureys,

He passes them in one evening.

Is he the cloud that brings rain in the night?

From the drought-bound desert,

When people despair of their flocks.

He drives the camels home.

Is he a noble warrior raiding enemy camps?

Grazing his field at night,

His whinnying keeps wild animals at bay,

— Ali Bu'ul (Cali Bucul), Guulside (Victory-Bearer!)

this particular poem alliterates echoing the horse's name. Another snippet from his other famous geeraar Amaan-Faras, In Praise of My Horse goes as follows:

From the seaside of Bulahar

to the corner of the Almis mountain

and Harawe of the pools

Hargeisa of the Gob trees

My horse reaches all that in one afternoon

Is it not like a scuddling cloud?

From its pen

A huge roar is heard

Is it not like a lion leading a pride?

In the open plains

It makes the camels kneel down

Is it not like an exper camel-rustler?

Its mane and tail has white tufts on the top

Is it not as beautiful as a galool tree abloom?

— Ali Bu'ul (Cali Bucul), In Praise of My Horse

=== Function in society ===
As the Somali Studies doyen Said Sheikh Samatar explains, a Somali poet is expected to play a role in supporting his clan, "to defend their rights in clan disputes, to defend their honor and prestige against the attacks of rival poets, to immortalize their fame and to act on the whole as a spokesman for them." In short, a traditional poem is occasional verse composed to a specific end, with argumentative or persuasive elements, and having an historical context.

The veteran British anthropologist and Horn of Africa specialist I. M. Lewis recounts how in the latter days of the rule of General Muhammad Siad Barre, the political opposition often relied on oral poetry, either recorded on cassette tapes or broadcast through the Somali language service of the BBC, to voice their dissent. When the British considered closing the Somali language service down for financial reasons, a delegation of prominent Somali leaders met with the British, and argued that "much as they appreciated the ambassador personally, it would be better to close the British embassy rather than terminate the BBC broadcast!"

=== Form ===
The form of Somali verse is marked by hikaad (or alliteration) and an unwritten practice of meter.

=== Modern poetry ===
==== Belwo ====
Belwo or Balwo was a form of Somali poetry that focused on love and developed in the 1920s and reached its pinnacle during the 1940s. Pioneered by Abdi Sinimo with earlier progenitors such as Elmi Boodhari influencing this new style. Balwo in somali roughly translates to misfortune and these poems often but not always dealt with heartbreak or longing.

Abdi Sinimo had his truck break down in a desert stretch in Awdal on route to Djibouti these words came out of his mouth and birthed the new form

Balwoy! Hoy balwoy
Waha i baleyey mooyaan
Waha i baleyey babur
Waha i baleyey berguba.

— Abdi Sinimo
Translation:

Balwoy! O Balwoy
I know not what made me suffer
It is a truck that made me suffer
She is berguba [a girl's name] who made me suffer

With some Belwos taking a more explicit tone, religious authorities would try to clamp down on Abdi and the new poetry that the youth were all composing. However, this failed and the style would soon move east from Borama to Hargeisa where Radio Hargeisa would give Belwo mass appeal amongst Somali youth and also incorporate critical new elements such as the oud and drum. Somali poets traditionally focused on the wit and spirit of a woman and this new shift to the physical was a paradigm change

This Belwo is a testament to its physical orientation on beauty

Qudhdhaydu ma jaclayn inaan Ku qasbee
Qummaatigan Ebbe Kuu qoray iyo
Waxay qaaday qaararkaa baxay
Wuxuu qoray ruuxna Kaama qaado
Oo qawadi maayo, qaybta i taal

— Modern Poetry and Songs of the Somali
Translation:

Myself I did not want to make you (love me)
But the perfect way in which God sculpted you
And your mature limbs overwhelmed me
What He has shaped, no one will take from you
I am not vexed with the share placed (here for) me

==== Heellooy ====
Developed in Hargeisa and Mogadishu to be played on the radio stations Heellooy initially was a long series of short Balwo. These series were unrelated to one another then chained after their composition and performed with the oud and drums. Abdullahi Qarshe was the first to bring the oud to play alongside while reciting these poems and under him the Heellooy would transition to a series of related verses forming one long continuous song. This modern pattern would go on to form the outburst of oud & poetry in a single flowing composition that would see some of the greatest Somali artists such as Cumar Dhuule, Mohamed Mooge, Ahmed Naaji, Mohamed Sulayman Tubeec enhance this genre in subsequent decades.

== Maay Poetry ==
Af Maay is sometimes classified as a separate language from Af Maaha or the ubiquitously known 'Standard Somali'. The Rahanweyn clan are the predominant Maay speakers in Somalia. In southern Somalia the poet and reciter were generally one and the same. British ethnologist Virginia Luling noted during her visit to Afgooye that poetry was to be conceived and recited simultaneously with no prior preparation. The poets or Laashin relied on their wit and memory to construct beautiful poems and entertain the audience

=== Abubakr Goitow ===
The poem The law then was not this law was performed by the leading Laashins of Afgooye, Hiraabey, Muuse Cusmaan and Abukar Cali Goitow alongside a few others, addressed to the current leader of Afgooye Sultan Subuge in 1989. It evoked the rich history of the Geledi and the past sultanate and the concerns the community of Afgooye had at the time.

Here the richest selection of the poem performed by Goitow

Ganaane gubow gaala guuriow Gooble maahinoo Geelidle ma goynin
Gembi iyo waran guraantiis aa loogu soo gayooday, Gooble
Gacalkiisa guri curad aa looga soo guuray Haddana nin walba aa
Soo gamgamohaayo, goofka beereed waa la goostay, gelgeshii
Gaashada daaqeysana waa la goostay, gunta intee la geyn doonaa?
Gobroontii soo gaartay Gobroontaan ma ahayn, gargooye Ibraahim
Cumar Xaaji goodaalka adunyada markii joogeen, Awow Gaduud Cali -
Mahinoo - Awow Gaduud Cali Abukar, Yusuf Maxamuud iyo goodaalka
Addunka markii joogeen, ganuunka ganuunkan ma ahayn, Awow
Gudgudoome Cumar Adeerow goodaalka aduunka markii joogeen
Ganuunka ganuunkan ma ahayn. Beereed waa la goostay, gelgeshii
Gaasha la la goostay, gaasha intee loola guuraa ?

Ganaane gubowow, gaala guuriow-aa
Gelgeshii la goostay go'aan maad ka gaart-aa (gaartay) ?

— Abubakr Cali Goitow The law then was not this law
Translation:

You who burnt Ganaane and chased away the infidels
Did you not separate from the Geelidle and come to Gooble (Afgooye)?
We endured war and the point of the spear
For the love of Gooble we left our first home
And now everyone crowds in here, they have taken our cleared farmland
They have taken the pasture where the herds grazed - where will the people be led ?
The Gobroon who first arrived here are not these Gobroon
When the giver of judgment Ibraahim Cumar Xaaji the pillar of the world was alive and Aw Gaduud Cali
Is it not so ? - Aw Gaduud Cali Abukar, and Yusuf Maxamuud the pillar of the world
While they were alive the law was not this law
When the giver of decisions Aw Cumar Adeerow was in the world the law was not this law
Now everyone crowds in, they have taken the cleared farmland,
They have taken the pasture of the herds where will we move the herds?

You who burnt Ganaane and chased away the infidels
Have you reached a decision about the stolen pastures?

== Folk literature ==
A Lion's tale

Somalis also have a rich oral tradition when it comes to ancient folktales, stories which were passed on from generation to generation. Many Somali folk tales of work and life are so old and ubiquitous their authorship is unknown. Tales such as Dhegdheer the cannibal woman were told to little children as a way to instill discipline in them since the dreaded Dhegdheer was said to pay a visit at night to all those who had been naughty. "Coldiid the wise warrior" is another popular Somali folktale with a positive message regarding a waranle (warrior) who avoids all forms of violence. For this abstinence, he is looked down upon by his peers. However, in the end, he manages to show that violence is no way to earn either respect or love. A Lion's tale is a popular children's book in the Somali diaspora wherein two Somali immigrant children struggle to adapt to life in a new environment. They find themselves surrounded by friends that strike them as greedy, only to magically return to Ancient Somalia where they live out all of the popular Somali folktales for themselves. A Lion's tale has also recently been developed into a school play.

Here a song a mother would sing to soothe her crying baby

Hobeeya hobeeya
Maxaa kugu dhacay dhiblaawe?
Maxaa Dhiidhida kuu leh?
Ma dhiishi baan la buuxin?
Ma naaskii baa gabloolay?
Gabloolood godol ka weydey?
Ma geeli baa arooray?
Arooroo oon ku raagey?
Socdaaloo socod ku ragey?
Ma giiraa geedo weydey?

— Why Capricious Be?
Translation:

Hey hey baby
Why cry darling mine?
Why so capricious be?
Hasn't the milk vessel been filled up?
Had mine breast dried up all?
A drop of milk giving you no more?
Had the milk camels gone
To water ponds far away?
Has daddy on journey gone away?
Tarrying to you to return?
Haven't the goats found grass fresh to feed on?

Rain a critical part of pastoralist life was often subject to humour and many poetry revolved around roob or the rains.

In this poem young women call for rain and tease elderly men for their baldness

Eebow roone roobey
Ku raaxeeya noo keen
Ku rays weyn leh noo keen
Ku odayada bidaarta leh
Bar naga laaya noo keen

— The Bald Headed Old Men
Translation:

O Almighty Allah
Send us rains blessing
That would soon cause
The goats milk much to yield
That would soon destroy
One half the bald-headed old men

Old men would respond to the young girls with their own taunt

Eebow roone roobey
Ku raaxeeya noo keen
Ku riya dararsha noo keen
Ku naagaha basaridaa
Bar naga laaya noo keen

— The Indolent Women
Translation:

O Almighty Allah
Send us rains blessing
That would soon cause
The goats milk much to yield
That would soon destroy
One half the lazy women folk

This song bridesmaids sing to the husband and invoking praise for the newlywed couple

Geesiyow!
Gargaar ayaannu kuu wadnaaye
Naga guddoon
Guul Eebe idin siiye
Naga guddoon
Toban wiiloo taabbagala
Eebbahay ku sii
Wiil iyo waalid
Guul ku waara
Naga guddoon...

— Take the Gift from Us
Translation:

Brave man!
Present beneficient to you we brought
The gift from us take
May Allah bless you both
The gift take from us
May Allah bless you
With ten sons strong
May parents and children all be
Victorious everafter
The gift from us take...

== Modern literature ==
Nuruddin Farah's Links.

Somali scholars have for centuries produced many notable examples of Islamic literature ranging from poetry to Hadith. With the adoption in 1972 of the modified Latin script developed by the Somali linguist Shire Jama Ahmed as the nation's standard orthography, numerous contemporary Somali authors have also released novels, some of which have gone on to receive worldwide acclaim.

Of these modern writers, Nuruddin Farah is probably the most celebrated. Books such as From a Crooked Rib and Links are considered important literary achievements, works that have earned Farah, among other accolades, the 1998 Neustadt International Prize for Literature. His most famous novel, Maps (1986), the first part of his Blood in the Sun trilogy, is set during the Ogaden conflict of 1977, and employs second-person narration for exploring questions of cultural identity in a post-independence world. Farah Mohamed Jama Awl is another prominent Somali writer who is perhaps best known for his Dervish era novel, Ignorance is the enemy of love. Mohamed Ibrahim Warsame "Hadrawi" is considered by many to be the greatest living Somali poet. Some have compared him to Shakespeare and his works have been translated internationally.

Cristina Ali Farah is a famous italo-Somali writer who was born in Italy to a Somali father and an Italian mother, Farah grew up in Mogadishu from 1976 to 1991. Her novels and poetry have been published in various magazines (in Italian and English) such as El Ghibli, Caffè, Crocevia, and in the anthologies "Poesia della migrazione in italiano" ("Poetry of migration in Italy") and "A New Map: The poetry of Migrant Writers in Italy". In 2006, Farah won the Italian national literary competition, "Lingua Madre" ("Mother Tongue"). She was also honored by the city of Turin at the "International Torino Book Fair". In 2007, she published her first novel, Madre piccola ("Little Mother"), based on her own experience living in Mogadishu. As of 2014, she writes some works in Somali language.

Shirin Ramzanali Fazel, of Somali origin, has contributed to bringing to light the memories of colonialism and exile, often in autobiographical and testimonial forms. Among her most significant work are the novel Far from Mogadishu (1994), Clouds over the Equator (2010) and Islam and Me (2023).

== Islamic literature ==
the celebrated religious and nationalist leader, also left a considerable amount of manuscripts. One of the better-known examples of Somali Islamic literature is Maja'mut al-Mubaraka, a work written by Shaykh Abdullah al-Qalanqooli and published in Cairo in 1918. Shaykh Abd Al-Rahman bin Ahmad al-Zayla'i also produced many Islamic-orientated manuscripts in the 19th century. In addition, poetry in the form of Qasidas was also popular among Somali Sheikhs, the latter of whom produced thousands of such works in praise of Muhammad.

This Qasida by Uways Al-Barawi called the Hadiyat al-ʿAnam ila Qabr al-Nabi (Guidance of Humanity to the Tomb of the Prophet) extols Muhammad.

إذا ماشئت تيسير المراد فصل على رسولك خير هادى
وقل مستنجدا في كل ناد صلاة الله مانادى المنادى
على المختار مولانا الحماد
حبيب الله افضل من ترقى وقبره فاق كرسيا ومرقى
وكل مواضع الخيرات صدقا يفوح المسك والريحان حقا
لقبر محمد نور الفؤاد
تنور جميع ارجاء الحبيب - يرى الانوار قاصده بطيب
ويلقاه البعيد مع القريب - يعم الال جيران الحبيب
بعرف عبيره اهل البلاد

— Uways Al Barawi Hadiyat al-ʿAnam ila Qabr al-Nabi
Translation:

Whenever you wish to make easy your objective then give a prayer to your messenger [Muhammad] the best of Guides
And say, seeking aid in every circle blessings of Allah, as the crier cries on the Chosen, our master the praised

Beloved of Allah preferred of those who ascended, his tomb is above any throne or high place
As in every pious place, sincerely musk and spices give fragrances, truly to the tomb of Muhammad light of the heart

Every aspect of the Habib gives light the one who seeks him, sees the lights with goodness
The distances meets it along with the near it will encompass the family, the neighbors of the beloved
As well as the people of the community, with knowledge of his fragrance

== See also ==
- List of Somali writers

== Bibliography ==
- Ahmed, Ali Jimale, Daybreak is Near - the Politics of Emancipation in Somalia: Literature, Clans, and the Nation State, Lawrenceville, 1996.
- Andrzejewski, Bogumił W., Somali Poetry, Oxford, 1969.
- Brioni, Simone, The Somali Within: Language, Race and Belonging in 'Minor' Italian Literature , Cambridge, 2015.
- Burton, Richard, First Footsteps in Somalia , London, 1854.
- Galaal, Muuse, I., Hikmad Soomaali, London, 1956.
- Kabjits, Georgij L., Waxaa la yidhi, Köln, 1996.
- Lawrence, Margaret, A Tree of Poverty: Somali Poetry and Prose, Nairobi, 1954.
