= Middle Eastern and North African music traditions =

This is a list of folk music traditions, with styles, dances, instruments, and other related topics. The term folk music cannot be easily defined in a precise manner. It is used with widely varying definitions depending on the author, intended audience and context within a work.

Similarly, the term traditions in this context does not connote any strictly defined criteria. Music scholars, journalists, audiences, record industry individuals, politicians, nationalists, and demagogues may often have occasion to address which fields of folk music are distinct traditions based along racial, geographic, linguistic, religious, tribal, or ethnic lines, and all such peoples will likely use different criteria to decide what constitutes a "folk music tradition". This list uses the same general categories used by mainstream, primarily English-language, scholarly sources, as determined by relevant statements of fact and the internal structure of works.

These traditions may coincide entirely, partially or not at all with geographic, political, linguistic, or cultural boundaries. Very few, if any, music scholars would claim that there are any folk music traditions that can be considered specific to a distinct group of people and with characteristics undiluted by contact with the music of other peoples; thus, the folk music traditions described herein overlap in varying degrees with each other.

== Middle East and North Africa ==
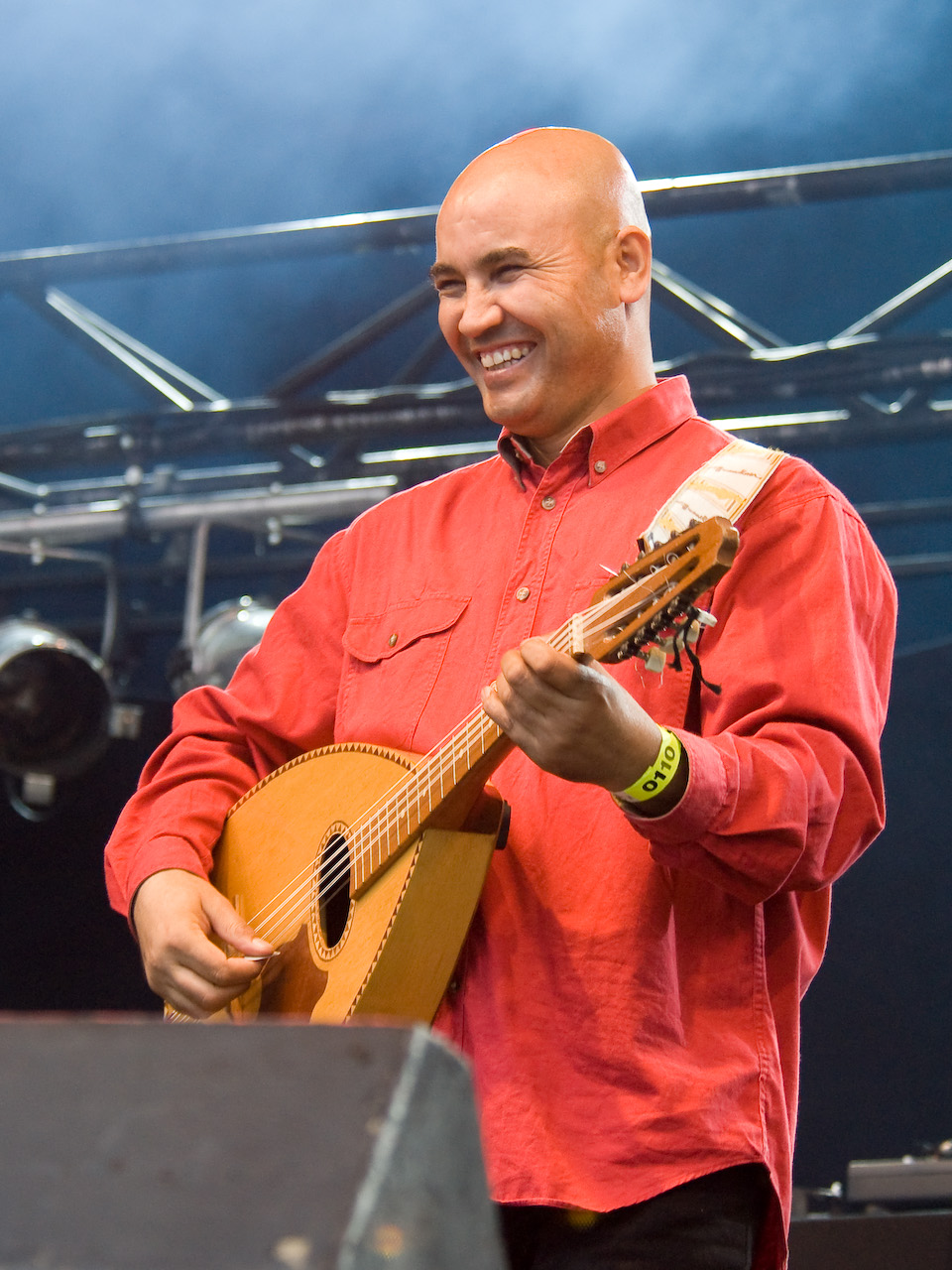
Algerian musician Abderrahmane Abdelli performing in Belgium

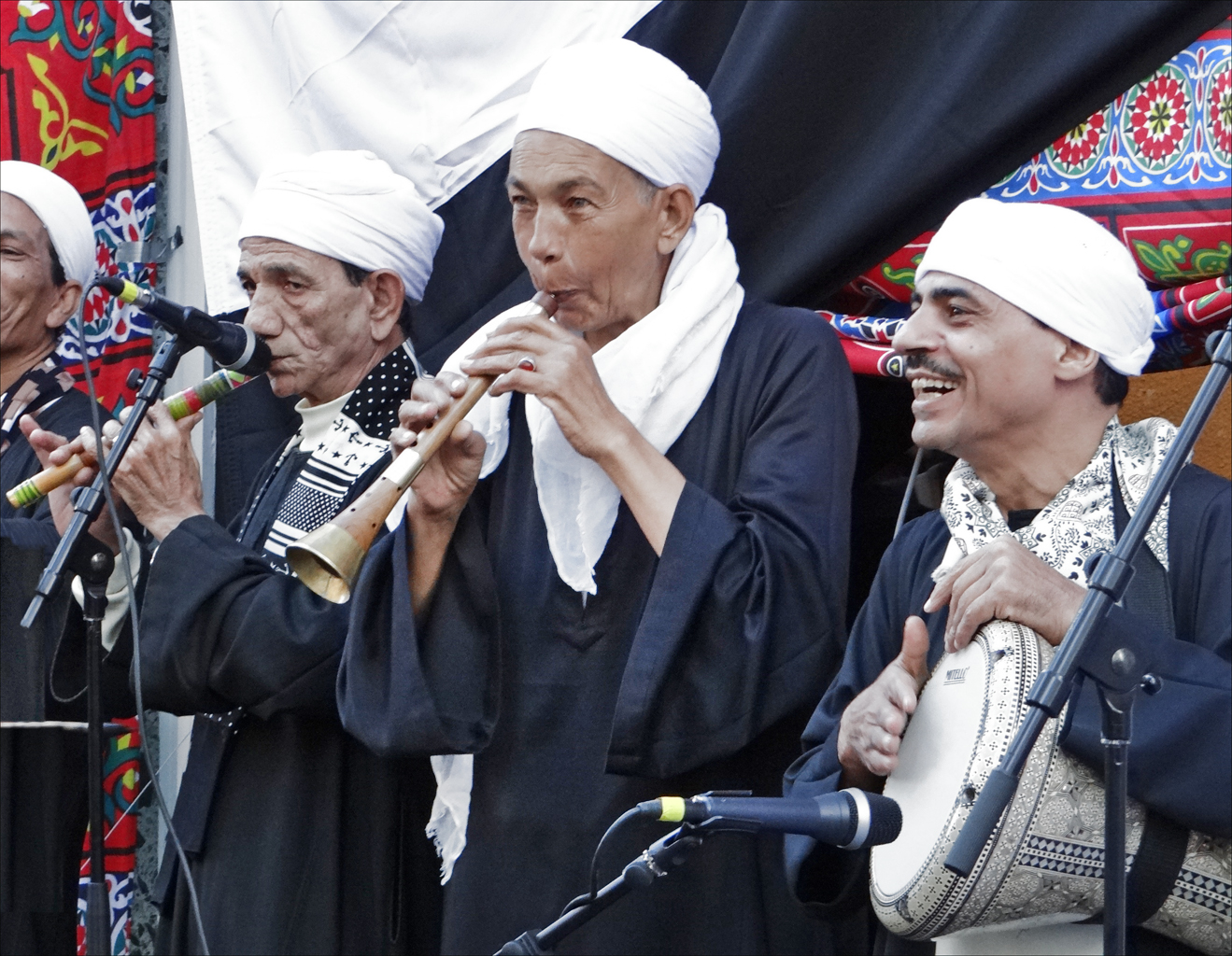
Egyptian music instrument Mizmar

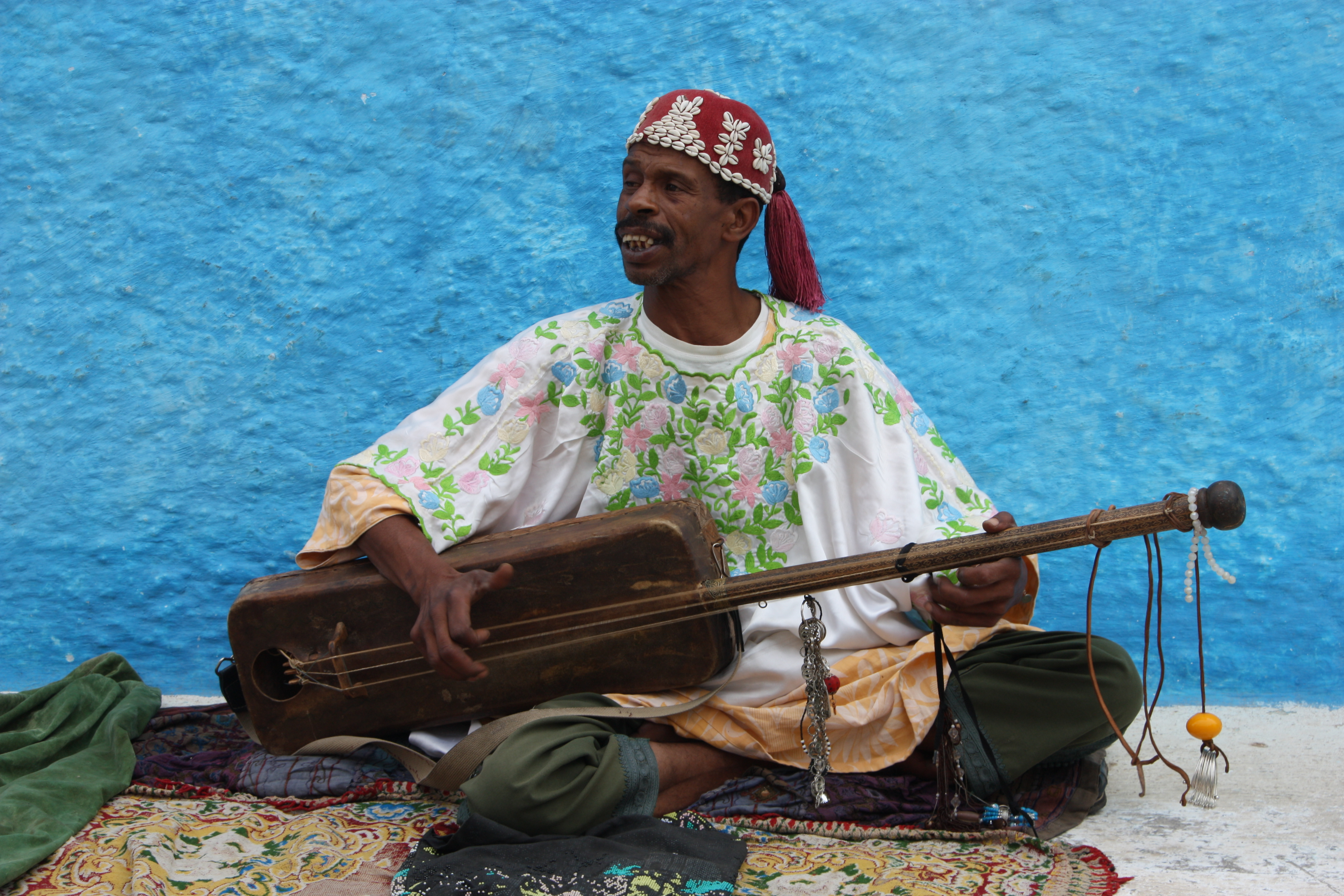
A Moroccan instrument sintir or gimbri

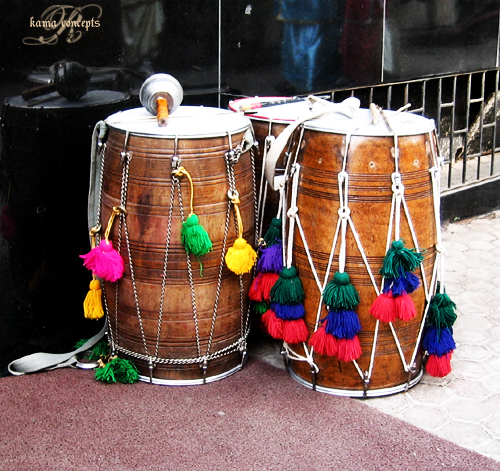
Iranian instrument dohol

Country	Elements	Dance	Instrumentation	Other topics
Armenian	kef – folk – liturgical – Tashnakzootyoun	tamzara – kochari – religious	duduk – oud – dumbeg – saz – bouzouki – shvi	
Algerian	medh – melhun – raï – zendani		gasha – mandole - rabab - guellal	berrah – cheikha – meddhahates – mehna – wa'adat
Assyrian	diwaneh – liliana – raweh		baglama – Çiftelia – davul – dhol – dutar – tambura – zurna – saz – watariyat	
Bahraini	See Persian Gulf region	–	–	–
Bedouin	zajal	fantasia	mijwis – mismar – yaghul	
Berber (Note: Includes the music of Kabylie and the Tuareg; World Music Central Archived 2006-02-07 at the Wayback Machine)	amarg – ammussu – astara – ritual music – tabbayt	aberdag – ahidu – ahouach – ahwash	ajouag – bendir – ghaita – lotar (instrument) – nakous – ney – rabab – t'bel – tinde – viol	amydaz – imdyazn – laamt – rwai
Chleuh	See Berber	–	–	–
Coptic	See Egyptian	–	–	–
Djiboutian	balwo		bowl lyre – tanbura	
Egyptian	Saiyidi – sawahili – wedding music	awalim	mismar saiyidi – nahrasan	
Emirati	See Persian Gulf region	–	–	–
Eritrean	folk – liturgical – popular		kebero – kobar – kraar – lyre – wata	
Ethiopian	folk – liturgical – popular		begena – kebero – kraar – masenqo – sistrum – washint	
Georgian	Georgian polyphony – krimanchuli – naduri – orovela – table song		accordion – changui – chonguri – chuniri – clarinet – duduk – panduri	
Hausa	Hausa		Gummi – ganga (cylindrical drum, snared and double-membraned) – kakaki – darbuka – tapsnee – qloo – tambari (large, bowl-shaped drum) - goje - kalangu - Jaju umpho umpho (a flute)	
Iranian			daf – dohol – karnay – lute – ney – ney-anban – zurna	
Israeli and diaspora Jewish	Klezmer – Sephardic music – Mizrahi music – Secular Jewish music	Israeli folk dancing – Horah –	lutes – oud	
Kabyle	See Berber	–	–	–
Khaleeji	See Persian Gulf region	–	–	–
Kuwaiti	See Persian Gulf region	–	–	–
Kurdish	epic		Bloor – daf – dhol – doozela – duduk – kamanche – ney – oud – santur – shimshal – tabalak – tar – tenbur – zil – zurna	chirokbej – dengbêj – stranbej
Persian Gulf region	Khaleeji music – sawt (music)-tarab-Adani-shela	Ardha, dabkah	duff – teeran – nay – oud – rababa – merwass – tabla – binges – qanun	
Lebanese		dabkah		
Mauritanian	al-bayda – epic – fagu – l'-gnaydiya – al-kahla – karr – labyad – lakhal – lebtayt	dabkah	ardin – daghumma – tbal – tidinit	iggawin
Moroccan	takht	ait atta – ait Bodar – ait Bugemaz (ait bouguemaz) – taskiwin	aghanin – bendir – darbuka – duff – garagab – ghaita – gimbri – guedra – kamanjeh – kanum – nai – nakous – oud – rabab – taarija – tabl – tan-tan – tar	moussem
Nubian			duff	
Omani	See Persian Gulf region	–	–	–
Palestinian	dalauna – meyjana – Zaghareet – wedding music- Ataaba – Sahja – zajal	dabka	duff – mijwiz – nay – oud – rababa – shababi – tabla – yarghoul-oud-qanun	zajaleen
Pashtun	Afghan wedding music – kiliwali	chub bazi – atan	daireh – dhol – rubab – tanbur	landai
Persian	See Iranian	–	–	–
Pontic Greek	folk - acritic - call and response - parakathi	Pontic Greek folk dance, including serra, dipat, atsiapat, omal, etc.	lyra - daouli - touloum - zourna - kemane - oud	
Qatari	See Persian Gulf region	–	–	–
Saudi Arabia	Qasida	Ardah – Mizmar – Daha	Oud – Rebab – Tar – Ney – Mizmar	
Arabic, Islamic, Jewish music	cantica – copla – endechas – romance – Songs for Purim – wedding music		accordion – darabouka – kanun – oud – tambourine	
Somali	balwo, qaraami, dhaanto		batar drum – oud	
Sudanese Arab	haqiiba		oud – tambour	
Tuareg	See Berber	–	–	–
Yemeni			oud	ghat
