= Ahmed Gacayte =

Somali singer, songwriter and composer

Ahmed Gacayte Axmed Gacayte
- Born: Ahmed Mohamed Yusuf; 1948; Hargeisa, British Somaliland
- Died: 1988 (aged 39–40) Hargeisa, Somalia
- Genre: Somali music
- Occupations: Musician, artist
- Instruments: Singing
- Years active: 1965–1988
- Formerly of: Magool; Sahra Halgan; Amina Abdullahi

Ahmed Mohamed Yusuf (Somali: Axmed Muxumed Yuusuf), most commonly known as Ahmed Gacayte (Axmed Gacayte), was a famous Somali singer, songwriter and composer. He hailed from the Habr Yunis subdivision of Garhajis

== History ==
Ahmed Gacayte was born in 1948 in a neighbourhood called Xidigta near the riverbed of Hargeisa, Somaliland. He was the oldest of 10 sons and 3 daughters. He took the nickname of his father, Mohamed Yusuf "Gacayte".

In 1964, reporters from Radio Hargeysa came to his school to scout for potential singing talent and eventually recruited Gacayte.

In 1965, Gacayte recorded his first song "Ahlan wa sahlan Daahir", which was broadcast on Radio Hargeysa. In response, his father disowned him and kicked him out of his home.

Gacayte then started composing and writing more songs and plays like "Bood Xirsi" and "Siyar" with Amina Abdullahi, as well as composing songs for Khadra Dahir Cige. He soon became famous throughout the Somali world, especially throughout present day Somaliland.

== Personal life ==
Gacayte died in 1988 in Hargeisa at the age of 40, at the height of the Isaaq genocide. Qorane Qodah Digale, a man of the Gaboye clan, was tried for his murder in late 2001; however, he was acquitted by the Hargeisa Regional Court of the murder charge.

== Discography ==
- Inaan Weli Ku Jecelahay
- Ilaah Baa Deeq Baxshee
- Umaleey Jacayl
- Orod orod
- Sabaalo
- Dulmiga
- Siyar (with Amina Abdullahi)
- Bood Xirsi (with Amina Abdullahi)
- Ahlan wa sahlan Daahir
