= Elmi Boodhari =

Somali poet (1908–1940)

Elmi Ismail Liban علمي اسماعيل ليبان The King of Romance
- Born: 1908; British Somaliland
- Died: 1941 (aged 33); Berbera, British Somaliland
- Occupation: Poet

Elmi Boodhari (Somali: Cilmi Ismaaciil Liibaan, Arabic: علمي اسماعيل ليبان) (1908 – 1941) was a Somali poet and pioneer in the genre of Somali love poems. He is known among Somalis as the King of Romance (Boqorkii Jacaylka). He was born near the border between Ethiopia and Somaliland in 1908 and hailed from the Abdirahman mus of Eidagale clan especially The Yonis Abdiraham sub-clan.

== Poetry ==
He is known in the Somali world for his love poems that he wrote to a girl named Hodan Abdulle that he fell in love and met in Berbera. Boderi was working at a bakery shop in the port city of Berbera when he fell in love with Hodan Abdi. Bodari began to write her romantic poems, and in one of his poems he spoke of once seeing Hodan’s naked body, which was considered a serious offense in those times given and still is, in addition to several other elements that stood in the face of him marrying her. Hodan got married and it is said that he died from the resulting heartbreak.

Elmi Boodhari differed from the poets of his generation in that he eschewed the popular theme of Tribal war and vengeance in Somali poetry, instead wholly focusing on love and composing all his poems for Hodan, which was seen as highly unconventional and scandalous, for this reason he was ridiculed by society.

Author Mohamed Diiriye in his book Culture and Customs of Somalia, writes:

Among the poets of the past century, a poet who has gained the hearts of all Somalis in every district is Elmi Boodhari, many major poets such as Mohamed Abdallah Hassan and Abdi Gahayr, aroused resentment among some Somalis, as they addressed diatribes against the members of a certain clan, or urged bloodletting; such poets are known as viper tongues, and the poems of such poets have been known to cause feuds and clan wars. But not so with Elmi Boodhari, his subject was romance and only that. While the poets of his day where addressing serious subjects such as war and feuds, Boodhari composed all of his poems for the lady of his affection Hodan, who was given in hand of marriage to a man much wealthier than him. Instead of getting literary kudos for his beautiful verse, Boodhari was made the object of public ridicule. Somali society had not been of course devoid of romance either in song or prose in any age, but to proclaim the object of ones love was frowned upon in the social mores of Somalis.

Boodhari also faced alienation and ridicule from his fellow Eidagale kinsmen and composed the following verse:

If a man has a wound he is taken to the doctor, but the braves of Daud are ridiculing me

Mohamed Diiriye commenting on the above verse writes:

It was enough that Hodan's relatives were infuriated and felt that their daughter's name had been soiled by a man who was proclaiming in public his love for her, but Boodhari also had to face the fury of his kinsmen, the Daud, who all together disowned him for spending his days pining for one woman when they could get him a girl as beautiful or more beautiful than she. Boodhari tried in lament to remind his kinsmen that the wounds of the heart merit the same attention as the wounds of the flesh.

=== Selected poem ===
"Qaraami" is a Somali poem translated by Margaret Laurence in her book A Tree for Poverty. The poem describes a woman’s physical appearance, including her height, posture, and skin. It mentions specific features such as her dark gums and the appearance of her eyes, which the narrator compares to the moon.

The narrator states that he has a strong emotional reaction when he sees the woman move. He expresses a concern that her appearance might attract negative attention from a "djinn," a type of supernatural spirit in Somali culture.

== Influence on Somali Music ==
Boodharis poetic style and subject matter heavily influenced Somali Music and musicians such as Abdullahi Qarshe who was one of the pioneers the popular Balwo and Heello Genres.

Matters began to change following World War 2 as musicians and composers, like Abdullahi Qarshe, popularly known as the father of Somali music, began to pioneer a new genre- that of Balwo and Heello, both of these terms refer to forms of lyrical verse, the difference between the two being that balwo is four lines only while heello is considerably longer. Both styles broke new grounds in style and content. the subject matter differed radically from the past, as compositions focused in on love and nationalism, rather than the epic tales of war and adversity as in the old hees, at least some of this shift can be accredited to Elmi Boodhari, a baker who composed during the 1930s. He is said to have recited his compositions describing his unrequited love for a woman named Hodan until he wasted away and perished in 1941. ~Africa: An Encyclopedia of Culture and Society [3 volumes]: An Encyclopedia of Culture and Society

== See also ==
- Abdillahi Suldaan Mohammed Timacade
- Gaariye
- Abdullahi Qarshe
- Hadraawi
- Mohamed Sulayman Tubeec
