= Music of Somaliland =

Overview of the music traditions in Somaliland

The music of Somaliland (Somali: Muusiga Somaliland) encompasses the musical styles, techniques, and oral traditions of the people of Somaliland. Historically centered in Hargeisa, which is often referred to as Hoygii Fanka (the Home of Somali Arts and Culture), the music of the region is characterized by its deep connection to oral poetry, pentatonic scales, and its role in national identity and political discourse.

== Overview ==
Traditional Somaliland music is centered on folklore and oral poetry. A song is typically the result of a "triad" of creators: the abwaan, the poet or songwriter who crafts the lyrics, the laxameyste, the melody maker or composer, and the codka (lit. 'voice'), the vocalist.

The general term for dance and rhythmic movement in Somaliland is ciyaar.

== Pentatonic scale ==
Somaliland songs utilize the pentatonic scale, which uses only five pitches per octave, distinct from the seven-note heptatonic scales (like the Major scale) common in Western music. While it shares similarities with the music of the neighboring Oromo people or Sudanese melodies, Somaliland music is defined by its unique phrasing and rhythmic cadences.

== Traditional instruments ==
The most iconic instrument in the music of Somaliland is the kaban. It is the backbone of qaraami, a soulful, urban genre that gained immense popularity in the mid-20th century.

Traditional Instruments of Somaliland
Category	Instruments
Membranophones	Nasaro, mokhoddon, and masoondhe (large drums); reeme and yoome (small drums).
Aerophones	Malkad and siinbaar (flutes); sumaari (double clarinet); buun and gees-goodir (horns).
Idiophones	Shanbaal (wooden clappers); shunuuf (vegetable ankle rattles).
Chordophones	Shareero (lyre); kinaandha (lute); seese (one-chord violin).

== History ==
Hargeisa became a center of music beginning in the 1940s, with the establishment of Radio Hargeisa, then the only radio source of live Somali performances. Early performers on the station included Mohamed Saeed "Guron-Jire" and the Hargeisa Brothers Band (Walaalaha Hargeysa), founded by Abdulahi Mohamed Mahmoud "Qarshe". The station played specialized music during Ramadan.

=== Contemporary revival ===
In the 21st century, Somaliland has experienced an artistic revival, led by organized musical collectives based in Hargeisa.

==== Xidigaha Geeska ====
Established in Hargeisa, Xidigaha Geeska (Stars of the Horn) is a prominent group of singers and musicians. They are credited with modernizing the "nationalistic ballad" and encouraging social cohesion through songs like "Allow Noo Tiirisee" and "Gooni Isu Taag." Notable members include Mohamed BK, Yurub Geenyo, and Mursal Muse.

==== Dayax Band ====
The Dayax Band represents a younger generation of artists known for high-production music videos and high-energy performances. They frequently perform during national holidays and are known for tracks like "Ku Qosla Bulshadaydiiyey".

== Music and politics ==
Music is a primary medium for political activism in Somaliland. During election cycles, artists often release tracks to support specific candidates or critique the administration. During the 2024 presidential elections, music played a pivotal role in public discourse, with songs like "Sool Bari Xageed Gaysay" by Xidigaha Geeska serving as a form of social and political critique.

New "patriotic anthems" are released each year for Somaliland's Independence Day in May, such as "Xornimo Sumadale" by Hodan Abdirahman.

Some Somaliland musicians, such as Sahra Halgan, have used music to publicize the cause for Somaliland's recognition as an independent state. Alternatively, some musicians have faced government censorship or repression for songs critical of authorities.

== See also ==
- Music of Somalia
- Culture of Somaliland
- Hargeisa Cultural Center
