= Qaraami =

Genre of traditional Somali music

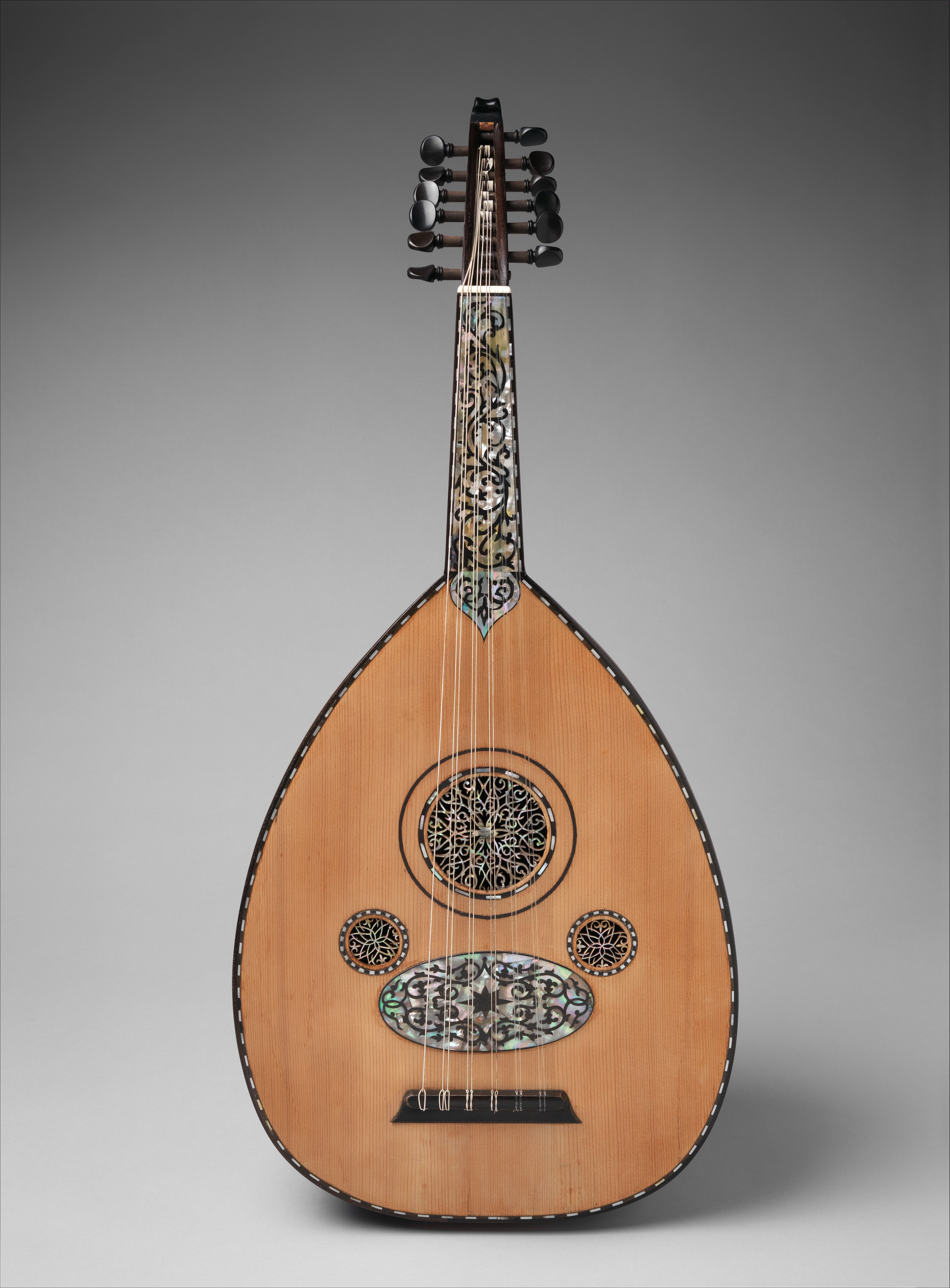
The Oud is a central part of the Qaraami tradition.

Qaraami is a traditional genre of Somali music that emerged in the mid-20th century. It is characterized by poetic lyrics, emotional themes, and a fusion of Somali musical traditions with slight influences from Arab and Western styles. The genre gained popularity during Somalia’s cultural renaissance in the 1930s and 1950s, particularly in urban centers such as Mogadishu and Hargeisa.

Qaraami songs are typically performed with an oud, and often deal with themes of love, longing, and social issues. Famous artists associated with the genre include pioneers such as Abdullahi Qarshe, Magool, Mohamed Sulayman Tubeec, and Hasan Adan Samatar. The genre played a significant role in shaping modern Somali music and remains influential in contemporary Somali culture.

== History and Origins ==
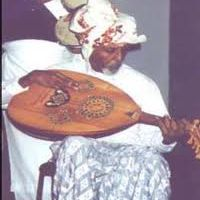
Abdullahi Qarshe, one of the pioneers of Qaraami.

The Qaraami music genre emerged in the 1930s from a specific form of poetry known as Qaraami. Originating in the historic town of Saylac (Zeila), the movement rapidly expanded to northern Somali towns such as Hargeisa and Berbera, where it gained widespread popularity among young people. The Qaraami poetry movement was spearheaded by a youth subculture known as the Kabacad, notable for their fashionable white shoes, which became an identifying symbol of the movement. Cilmi Boodheri is widely recognized as the most famous of the Kabacad poets. Leading Qaraami poets were regularly invited to perform at wedding ceremonies and popular gatherings known as "gaaf," which attracted large crowds of young people in spite of widespread disapproval from elders and religious scholars.

Qaraami poems were collaboratively composed by groups of young poets seated in a circle, who improvised short verses in formats such as lug-kowle (one-lined), labaale (couplets), and saddexle (triplets), with one poet reciting a line and the final half-line (hooris) chanted collectively as a chorus before the next poet continued. This innovative method, referred to by the Kabacad as ‘subcis’ (or rotation) and influenced by traditional Quranic revising sessions, marked a departure from the conventional Somali gabay style. Qaraami songs display notable influences from traditional pastoral folk dances such as the Dhaanto, incorporating its metrical pattern and couplet stanza format. According to Qarshe, the emergence of modern Somali song in the north was largely driven by the urban revival of the Dhaanto movement led by Diiriye Baalbaal.

Abdullahi Qarshe is widely credited with being the first to set Qaraami poetry to music and is recognized as the founder of the modern Qaraami music genre. Other notable Kaban players of the 50s included Ali Feiruz and Mohamed Nahari. According to Afrax, the genre eventually split into two distinct forms, termed 'Qaraami 1' and 'Qaraami 2', with the later kind emerging in the 40s.

== Themes ==
Romantic love is the overwhelmingly dominant theme of Qaraami poetry and its associated music, with the songs characterized by soothing, melodic chants. Qaraami is characterized by its intimate lyrics, oud accompaniment, and extended melismatic phrasing. Qaraami songs soon expanded beyond romantic themes to address broader social and political issues, including anti-colonial pan-Somali nationalism. For instance, Abdullahi Qarshe, while working for the British administration, was invited to compose a welcome song for the new governor in Berbera. Exploiting the authorities’ unfamiliarity with Somali, he created “Ka kacay!” (“Arise!”) as a covert rallying call for Somalis to awaken against colonial rule.

== Pioneers ==
- Abdullahi Qarshe
- Magool
- Mohamed Sulayman Tubeec
- Hasan Adan Samatar
- Hudeidi

== See also ==
- Somali Music
- Oud
- Middle Eastern and North African music traditions

=== Further reading ===
- Between continuity and innovation: transitional nature of post-independence Somali poetry and drama, 1960s–the present, Maxamed Daahir Afrax, SOAS, University of London, 2013.
- Chapter 1: Somali Theatre, Jane Plastow, A History of East African Theatre, Volume 1: Horn of Africa, 51-135, 2020.
- Magool: the inimitable nightingale of Somali music, Bashir Goth, Bildhaan: An International Journal of Somali Studies 14 (1), 5, 2015.
