= Baxsan =

Somali singer-songwriter (1935–2020)

Seynab Haji Ali Siigaale (popularly known as Baxsan; born 1935, Baabili – died 2020, Mogadishu) was a Somali singer, songwriter and stage actress. Along with Magool and Guduudo Carwo, Baxsan was one of the most popular performers of the 20th century.

== Life ==
Seynab Haji Ali Siigaale was born in Baabili in a Somali merchant family based in the area of Haud. Her father, Haji Ali Siigaale, was a trader and her mother, Hawo Said Daroore, a housewife. For a time, she ran a tea business in her hometown. She moved to Dirirdhabe where she worked in the coffee industry, after which she settled in Addis Ababa, where she started singing professionally.

In 1960, after a coup against the Ethiopian emperor Haile Selassie failed, Seynab escaped to Somaliland, which shortly thereafter became an independent Somali republic. At this time she adopted the name Baxsan, meaning escape, which was given to her by Guduudo Carwo.

Baxsan lived in Hargeisa for a time, before moving to Mogadishu, where she would stay the rest of her life. Even during the brutal civil war in the 1990s, she remained in Somalia when many of her colleagues in the cultural sphere emigrated. This gained her considerable respect from her countrymen.

Baxsan died on 19 October 2020. Considering her vast popularity in the country and the affection she was held in, there was widespread criticism when she was not given a state funeral by the government.

== Artistic career ==
At a time when Somali music was emerging, women singing publicly was not generally accepted by custom. Women feared hostility in the popular sphere. It was a time when most of the songs were audio-recorded and the visual effects were not very well known. In this milieu, Baxsan started her musical performances, one of the first women in Somali popular music. In Addis Ababa, the Somali community was more welcoming of women's singing, and artistes tended to perform there. In 1963, however, Baxsan went to Hargeisa with Guduudo, where they formed a famous quartet with Magool and Maandeeq.

Stirred by the independence movement against the British and Italian occupiers of Somaliland, Baxsan's first song was Alla Amin Ma Iisho, composed by the poet Ahmed Saleban Bidde. When war broke out between Somalia and Ethiopia in 1964, it was her song Geyshkayow Guuleysta (O our soldiers, win the war) that inspired the Somali soldiers. Her songs at this time were patriotic and martial, and she joined the Somali Army's singing troupe. She was awarded medals by the Somali government for her support in the war.

In Mogadishu, Baxsan acted in cultural and political theatre written by Somali playwrights Ahmed Saleebaan Bidde and Yusuf Adan Allaale. With the construction of the Somali National Theatre building in 1967, there was a big jump in cultural output and popular demand. It is reported that when Baxsan performed, the theatre, which had a capacity of 3,000, was often crammed with thousands more. In 1969, when the military took over the government, she joined Waaberi, a state-sponsored musical troupe. When war broke out against Ethiopia again in 1977, Baxsan didn't support the military as before, but because she hadn't opposed it, she received another medal from the Somali government.

During the Somali civil war, Baxsan composed lyrics and poetry in support of peace and reconciliation.

There are several love songs that Baxsan was famous for, such as Cirradiyo Jacaylka (lyrics by the poet Mohamud Abdullahi Isse Singub), which she asked him to compose when she was struggling with an old love affair.

== Bibliography ==
- Goth, Bashir (2015). "Magool: The Inimitable Nightingale of Somali Music". Bildhaan. 14.
- Yakubu, Moses Joseph (2017). "Women Peacemaking Initiatives and Sustainable Development: The Role of Women in Peace Making Process during the Liberian Civil War, 1989–2003". In Anaemene, Benjamin U.; Bolarinwa, Olusegun J. (eds.). Agenda 2030 & Africa's Development in the 21st Century. United Nations University International Institute for Global Health. ISBN 978-92-808-8106-6.
- Farah, Ubah Cristina Ali (2020). "Mogadishu as lost modern: In conversation with A Naked needle". Tydskrif vir Letterkunde. 57 (1). doi:10.17159/2309-9070/tvl.v.57i1.7984.
- Dhaaley, Maxamed Cabdullaahi (22 October 2020). ""Qiimeyn ma arag!": Baxsan ma heshay aaskii qaran ee ay u baahnayd?" (in Somali). BBC News.
- Ingiriis, Mohamed Haji (15 November 2020). "Remembering Baxsan, one of the most popular Somali singers of all time". The Scroll.
