= Guduuda 'Arwo =

Somalian singer

Guduuda 'Arwo or Guduudo Carwo, real name Shamis Abokor Ismail, was a Somali singer. She was a vocalist for Radio Hargeisa in Hargeisa, the capital of Somaliland.

== History ==
The BBC described her family as "conservative".

Nicknamed "Guduuda 'Arwo" ("Red 'Arwo"), Shamis Abokor was recruited by Radio Hargeisa in 1953. She used a false name so her family would be unaware of her singing. She sang her first heello song in August of that year, becoming the first female recording vocalist in the British Somaliland Protectorate and the Trust Territory of Somaliland. According to Johnson (1996), 'Arwo encountered criticism for this, as Dalays had prior to her.

In 1963, she formed a quartet with Baxsan, Magool and Maandeeq. At the height of her popularity, Guduuda 'Arwo performed love songs to audiences of thousands of fans.

Her career ended after she suffered a stroke and became paralysed. Since around 1997, she had been under the care of relatives. Her United Kingdom-based daughter also sent remittances to her through the Dahabshiil money transfer operator. As of September 2013, she was 78 years old. She died in Hargeisa in 2017 at the age of 85.

== See also ==
- Music of Somalia
