= Gaariye =

Somali poet and political activist

Mohamed Hashi Dama Maxamed Xaashi Dhamac
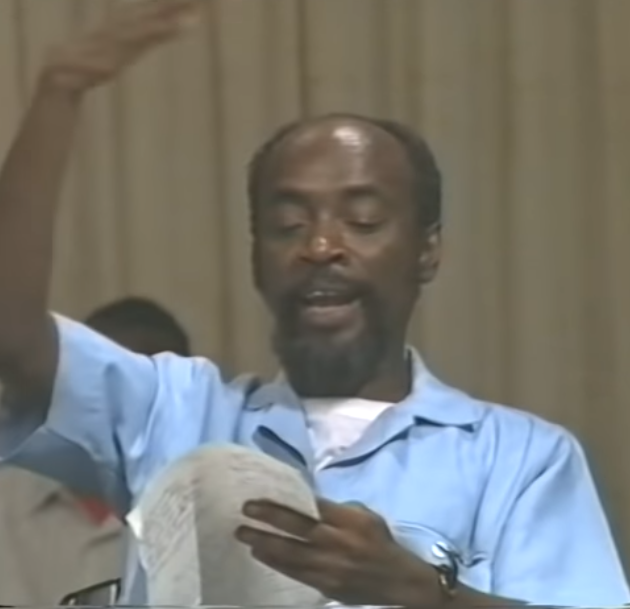
- Gaariye reciting poetry in the 1980s
- Born: 1949; Hargeisa, British Somaliland (now Somaliland)
- Died: September 30, 2012 (aged 62–63); Norway
- Education: Somali National University
- Occupations: Poet, Activist
- Writing career
- Pen name: Gaarriye
- Subjects: Patriotism, Anti-Apartheid, Reconciliation
- Notable works: Hargarlaawe, Delley, Fad Galbeed, Garaad-daran

Mohamed Hashi Dhamac (Somali: Maxamed Xaashi Dhamac, 1949 – 30 September 2012) better known as Gaarriye, was a Somali poet and political activist.

== Biography ==
Gaariye was born in Hargeisa in 1949 in former British Somaliland. He finished his elementary and secondary studies in Hargeisa in the early 1970s. and for University studies he enrolled in the Somali National University College in Afgooye and took the degree in bachelor of science in 1974. Known as a sharp critic, he would start the famous Deelley poetic chain in response to repression in Somalia under Siad Barre's rule. Other famous poets such as Hadrawi would contribute to Deelley. He was a member of the Somali National Movement and following the Somali Civil War he composed one of the best known Somali poems on the theme of reconciliation, "Hagarlaawe" (The Charitable) which is translated into English by Martin Orwin. In the 1970s Gaariye independently discovered the Somali prosodic system around the same time as fellow literary scholar Abdillahi Diiriye Guled.

Gaarriye died at a hospital in Norway on 30 September 2012.

== Children ==
Hodan, Hoodo, Hiddo, Hibo

== Poetry ==
Gaariye worked closely with British linguist Martin Orwin in the later years of his life to transcribe and translate many of his best poems into English. His translated poems were published post humously alongside Hadraawi's and some other prominent contemporary Somali poets in a 2018 biography of Gaariye.

== Works ==
- Maxamed Xaashi Dhamac (2013). Hagarlaawe : diiwaanka maansooyinka. Hargesya : Sagalet. ISBN 9780956117335.
- Maxamed Xaashi Dhamac, Jama Musse Jama (ed.) (2012). Maxamed Xaashi Dhamac "Gaarriye" : biography and poems. Pisa : Ponte Invisibile. ISBN 9788888934334.

== See also ==
- Hadraawi
- Elmi Boodhari
- Abdillahi Suldaan Mohammed Timacade
- Somali literature
