= Ibrahim Isse Tuur =

- Ibraahin Ciise Tuur
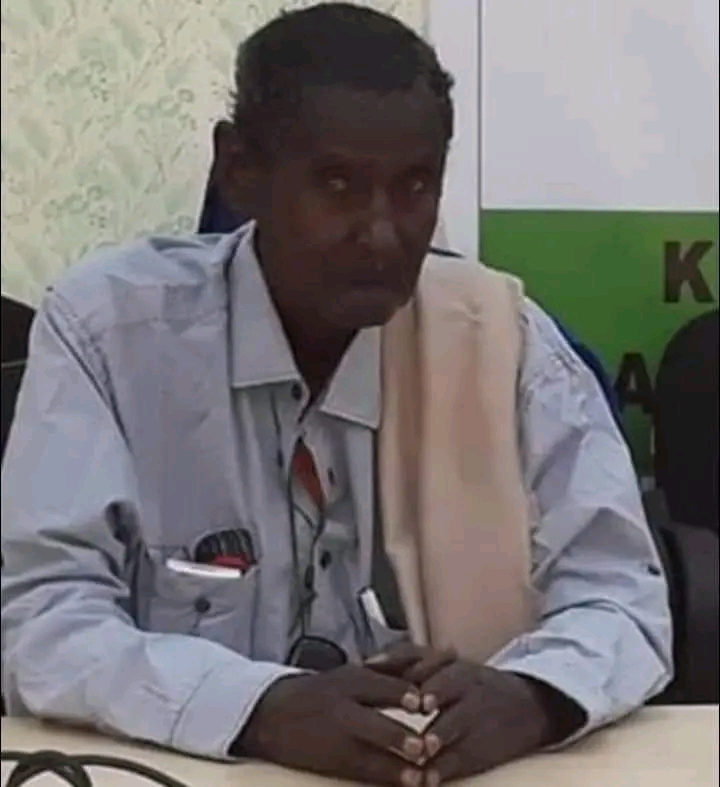
- Ibrahim Isse Tuur
- Died: March 15, 2020 (aged 74–75); Wardheer, Sanaag, Somalia
- Other name: Ibraahin Cajaa'ib
- Education: PhD in Foreign Languages
- Occupations: Poet; playwright; linguist
- Known for: Founding Waaberi Puntland

Ibrahim Isse Tuur (Ibraahin Ciise Tuur), widely known by his pen name Ibraahin Cajaa'ib, was a Somali poet, playwright, linguist, and intellectual who made substantial contributions to Somali language, literature, and performing arts. He was a member of the Somali National Armed Forces and a multilingual scholar trained in Europe and the former Soviet Union.

== Early life and education ==
Ibrahim Isse Tuur completed his primary, intermediate, and secondary education in Aden, Yemen, where he studied at Saint Joseph’s Catholic School. His literary creativity began during his student years in Yemen, where he wrote several theatrical plays.

Following Somalia’s independence, he traveled to Europe to pursue higher education in linguistics. He earned both a Master’s degree and a Doctorate (PhD) in Foreign Languages.

== Literary career ==
Tuur was a prolific literary figure whose work included poetry, plays, songs, and prose. He later became involved in Somali performing arts and contributed to major stage productions.

Among his well-known poetic and musical works were:

- Gaddoon
- Ila Noxo Ul iyo Diir
- Ilwaad (performed jointly by Xasan Aadan Samatar and Khadra Daahir Cige)

== Death ==
Dr. Ibrahim Isse Tuur passed away on 15 March 2020 in Wardheer, Sanaag region, Somalia.
