= Somali Museum of Minnesota =

- Matxafka Soomaalida Minnesota (Somali)

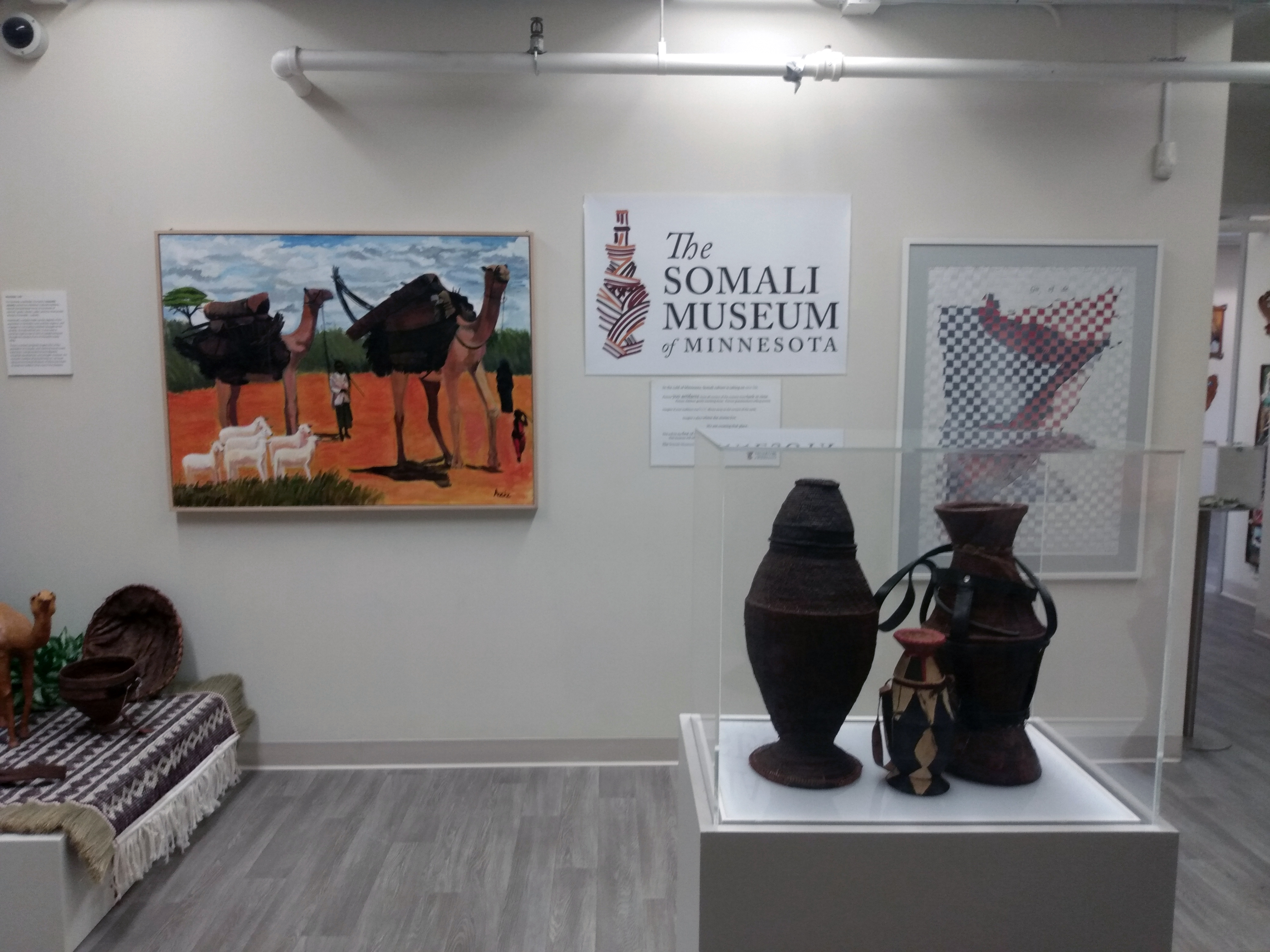
- An exhibit at the Somali Museum of Minnesota
- Former name: Somali Artifact and Cultural Museum
- Established: 2009
- Location: 2925 Chicago Lake Street, Minneapolis, Minnesota
- Coordinates: 44.948653°N 93.253067°W
- Collections: Somali art, Culture of Somalia
- Director: Osman M. Ali
- Public transit access: Bloomington Ave & Lake St, Metro Transit (Minnesota)
- Website: somalimuseum.org

The Somali Museum of Minnesota (also known as the Somali Artifact and Cultural Museum) is a cultural institution in Minneapolis, Minnesota, United States. The Minneapolis–Saint Paul metro area is home to the largest Somali immigrant and refugee population in the United States, after civil war in Somalia prompted large-scale displacement of the Somali people. The Somali Museum of Minnesota presents a collection of more than 1000 traditional nomadic artifacts from Somalia, as well as educational programming about Somali culture, arts events, and cross-cultural activities. It may now be the only museum in the world dedicated to preserving Somali culture and traditions.

== Mission and history ==
The Somali Museum of Minnesota was incorporated as the Somali Artifact and Cultural Museum in December 2011. Prior to that date, the museum's director Osman Ali carried out cultural preservation activities independently, by collecting artifacts and presenting lectures about Somali culture around Minneapolis and Saint Paul. In 2013, the Somali Museum opened a public gallery on Lake Street, which is the museum's present location. In 2014, the Museum co-presented a pop-up gallery in downtown Minneapolis as part of the Made Here project of Hennepin Theatre Trust In 2015, the Museum celebrated its gallery's 2nd Anniversary with a community celebration featuring Somali performers from around the world, including Fadumo Nakruuma, Hodan Nalayeh, and Nasteexo Indho. Tickets for this event were sold out. In 2018, the Somali Museum collaborated with the Minnesota Historical Society to produce the “Somalis + Minnesota” exhibit. It was named one of the best exhibitions of Winter 2019 in the United States by USA Today. Later that year, the Somali Museum opened its very own Somali Museum gift shop with the help of multiple artists, authors, and Somali fashion designers. In late 2019, the Somali Museum worked on the publishing of the Museum's first-ever book, Baro Agabkaaga. The book comprises a detailed description of the many artifacts carried in the museum.

The Somali Museum offers programs classes in cultural education through weaving, dance and poetry, as well as touring exhibitions and outreach events in the Minneapolis–Saint Paul metro area. The Somali Museum was voted Minnesota's "Best Mini-Museum" by Mpls.St.Paul Magazine in 2015. “Somali Museum of Minnesota Day” was awarded by Governor Mark Dayton on October 1, 2016.

== Exhibits ==
The Somali Museum displays a collection of artifacts from nomadic society in Somalia, as well as contemporary paintings created by artists in Somalia and the diaspora. Its galleries feature exhibits of milk and water vessels, weaving, artifacts associated with women's work and care for camels, and religious items. The museum also displays two traditional houses: one nomadic home (aqal Soomaali in the Somali language) and one village home (called a mudul). The aqal Soomaali was built first on Lake Street in Minneapolis, then installed at the Somali Museum in July 2014

== Leadership ==
The Somali Museum's executive director is Osman Mohamed Ali. According to interviews, in 2009 Ali traveled to Somalia to visit an ailing relative and was saddened by young Somalis' lack of knowledge about traditional Somali culture. When he also discovered that the only cultural museum in Somalia was destroyed, he started collecting artifacts to start his own.

The Somali Museum is also led by a nine-member Board of Directors and committee of advisors.

== Notable visitors ==
In 2015, Boqor Burhaan, a regional king from Puntland, Somalia, held a reception at the Somali Museum as part of a visit to the Somali community in Minnesota. Other notable Somali guests to the Somali Museum include former Prime Minister of Somalia Abdiweli Sheikh Ahmed, former Minister of Defense of Somalia Hussein Arab Isse, singer Cadar Kahin, singer Maryam Mursal, singer Aar Maanta, fashion model Halima Aden, rapper K'naan, entrepreneur Amina Moghe Hersi and poet Said Salah Ahmed. Said Salah Ahmed was also the former chair of the Somali Museum's board of directors.

Notable guests in Minnesota government include U.S. Congressman Keith Ellison, U.S. Senator Al Franken, Mayor of Minneapolis Betsy Hodges, Minneapolis City Council Member Abdi Warsame, U.S. Representative for Minnesota's 5th congressional district Ilhan Omar and Minnesota State Representative Karen Clark.

== Location ==
The Somali Museum was housed in the Plaza Verde, a building owned and maintained by the Neighborhood Development Center, a non-profit small business incubator based in St. Paul, Minnesota. In 2017, the building was purchased by businessman Khadar Adan. He named the building Jigjiga Business Center. The Somali Museum is currently housed in Midtown Exchange Green (Lower) Level.

== Resident artists ==
Resident artists at the Somali Museum have included traditional craftspeople, performance artists, painters, and storytellers. Artists Ardho Ismail, Hawa Ahmed, Amina Shire, and Halwa Daud weave textiles in a traditional nomadic style, teach weaving classes, and lead nomadic craft events at the Somali Museum. The museum gallery also displays paintings by Minnesota-based painters Aziz Osman and Madaxay. Oral poets who have performed and taught at the Somali Museum include Ahmed Ismail Yusuf and Said Salah Ahmed. Performance artists Ifrah Mansour, Abdihakin BR, Naima Jookar, Mohamed Pracetimool, Safiya Tusmo, Abdijibar Alkhaliji, Hodan Abidrahman, Dalmar Yare, Rahma Rose, Ilkacase Qays, Anab Indho-Dheeq, Farhiyo Kabayare, Osman Bullo, Ahmed Ali Egal, Hibo Nura, Khadija Abdullahi Daleys and Aadar Kahin have also presented at events.

== Logo ==
The Somali Museum's logo, which depicts a dhiil, or traditional nomadic milk vessel, was designed by Kaamil Haider. The colors used in the logo echo colors of the iconic nomadic costume guntiino.

== See also ==
- Somali art
- Somali American
- History of the Somalis in Minneapolis–Saint Paul
- List of museums in Minnesota

== See also ==
- List of museums in Minnesota
