= Cristina Ali Farah =

Italian writer

Ubah Cristina Ali Farah
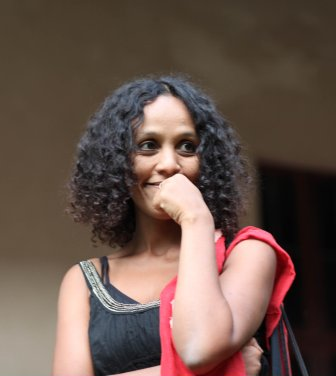
- Born: Cristina Ali Farah; 1973 (age 52–53); Verona, Italy
- Education: La Sapienza University
- Occupations: novelist, essayist
- Writing career
- Subjects: immigration, colonialism, feminism
- Notable work: Madre piccola (2007)

Ubah Cristina Ali Farah (born 1973 in Verona, Italy) is an Italian writer of mixed Italian and Somali descent.

== Biography ==
Born in Italy to a Somali father and an Italian mother, Farah grew up in Mogadishu, the capital of Somalia. She attended an Italian school there until the Somalia Civil War broke out in 1991.

Farah and her family subsequently relocated to Pécs, Hungary, but then later moved back to her birthplace, Verona, Italy. There, she obtained an Italian Lettere University degree at La Sapienza University in Rome, since 2013 she resides in Brussels (Belgium).

== Literary career ==
Ubah Cristina Ali Farah is a Somali Italian poet, novelist, playwright, librettist and oral performer. She has published three novels, Madre piccola (Little mother); Il comandante del fiume (The commander of the river); and Le stazioni della luna (The stations of the moon). In 2011, Indiana University Press published Madre piccola, translated by Giovanna Bellesia. She holds a Ph.D. in African Studies and has been invited to present her work in numerous countries worldwide. She is the recipient of the Lingua Madre and Vittorini Prizes. She participated in the University of Iowa’s International Writing Program (2017), in the MEET (Maison des Écrivains Étrangers et des Traducteurs) and Art Omi Residencies (2018). She has been a Civitella Ranieri Foundation Fellow and La Marelle Writer in residence in 2019. Recently she worked on a rewriting of the Antigone and on a libretto taken from found stories in Matera. She has just taken up an artist-in-residence fellowship at Stellenbosch Institute for Advanced Studies for the first semester 2020.

In addition to her fictional works, Farah has also published a book on the history, rise, and common themes of Somali folk theatre from 1940 to 1990.

In November 2020 Meet Editions will publish a bilingual (French and Italian) collection of her short stories. She is working with Belgian artist and illustrator Goele Dewanckel on a Serigraphic book to be published next year by Else Edizioni.

She is currently a UNDP consultant for a project on Oral Historiography for Peace Building in Somalia.

== See also ==
- Italian Somalians

== Bibliography ==
- Ai confini del verso: Poesia della migrazione in italiano (At the boundaries of verse. Poetry of migration), Florence: Le Lettere, 2006.
- A New Map: The poetry of Migrant Writers in Italy, texts collected by Mia Lecomte et Luigi Bonaffini, Green Integer, Los Angeles, 2007.
- Madre piccola ("Little Mother"), Frassinelli, 2007.
- Il comandante del fiume (The commander of the river), 66th and 2nd, 2014
- LATITUDE Rethinking Power Relations – for a decolonised and non-racial world , 2021.
- Simone Brioni. The Somali Within. Language, Race and Belonging in 'Minor' Italian Literature. Cambridge: Legenda 2015.
