= Ali Feiruz =

Ali Abdi Feiruz علي فيروز
- Born: Cali Fayruus; 1931; Djibouti, French Somaliland
- Died: 1994 (aged 62–63) Djibouti City, Djibouti
- Genres: Somali music
- Occupations: Musician, composer
- Instruments: Oud, guitar, violin, accordion
- Years active: 1950s–1990s

Ali Abdi Feiruz, known as Ali Feiruz, (Somali: Cali Fayruus) was a prominent Somali musician. He belonged to the Habr Awal clan of the Isaaq clan family.

== Biography ==
Feiruz was born in 1931 in Djibouti. He later moved to Hargeisa, Somaliland in the late 1950s, and then on to Mogadishu in 1973.

Feiruz's career began with Radio Hargeisa in the late 1950s. He was one of the first popular Somali kaban (oud) players in the 1950s, and eventually began incorporating modern instruments into his performances in the 1960s, such as the guitar, violin and accordion.

A prominent member of the Walaalaha Hargeisa and Hobolada Waaberi musical troupes, Feiruz composed, among other tunes, Ilaahayow waa kugu mahad, a tune whose release coincided with the independence of the former British Somaliland protectorate. As of 2012, this music still serves as the opening theme for the news segment of both Radio Mogadishu and Radio Hargeisa.

Feiruz had a significant influence on newer generations of Somali musicians in the 1960s and 1970s. He died in Djibouti in mid-1994.

== See also ==
- Waaberi
- Abdullahi Qarshe
- Music of Somalia
