= Xiddigaha Geeska =

Musical band in Somaliland

- Origin: Hargeisa, Somaliland
- Genres: Pop; pop rock
- Years active: 2004–Present
- Label: Furinle Studio
- Members: For more listings See Below

Xiddigaha Geeska (The Horn Stars) (Arabic: نجوم القرن) is a Somali music band from Somaliland. The band is funded by Somaliland's Ministry of Information and National Guidance. The band is led by Ahmedweli Ibrahim Furinle (Somali: Furinle).

== History ==
Xiddigaha Geeska was formed in Hargeisa, Somaliland in 2004. The band first rose to fame for promoting the Horn Cable Television group, a Somali television channel based in Somaliland. The band was formed at a time when the broader Somali entertainment and music industry was still struggling due to war, radicalization and cultural stereotyping, and the band soon grew to become a household name in Somaliland as well as other Somali-inhabited territories.

== Members ==
Name	Nickname	Joined	Left	Reference
Mursal Muse		Founding member (2012)	Present	
Ahmed Weli	Furinle	Founding member (2012)	Present	
Khadra Abdi	Silimo	2012	Present	
Asma Ahmed	Love	Founding member (2012)	Present	
Mohamed Siciid	BK	2012 - 2016, Returned 2025	Present	
Hamda Abdi	Queen	2012	2018	
Nimcan Abdirahman	Hillaac	2013	2016	
Mohamed Ahmed	Cirro	2013	Present	
Yurub Mohamed	Geenyo	2013	2017	
Abdihani Hashi		2013	Present	
Abdirahman Aydid	Oday	2013	Present	
Yusuf Adan	Jeego	2014	2016	
Ifrah Ahmed	Hargeisa	2014	Present	
Yusuf Adan	Jeego	2014	2016	
Ismail	Danan	2014	2016	
Sidiiq Burmad		2014	2015	
Ifrah	Tolmoon	2014	2016	
Yusuf	Hanad	2014	2015	
Abdirisaq	Anshax	2014	Present	
Maxamed	Xarrago	2013	Present	

== Controversies ==
A major controversy arose when four members of the group arrived in Mogadishu, Somalia to perform and shared photos online with a blue Somali flag, causing their arrest by Somaliland police for allegedly violating Somaliland's sovereignty.

== Tours and Concerts ==
The Horn Stars have performed in several concert tours outside of Somaliland, including Djibouti, Ethiopia, Kenya, Uganda, and the United Kingdom. The band's debut solo concert tour of 2015 visited Mogadishu.

== Discography ==
- Guushi way timiday
- Gooni isu taag
- Hashii dhacantay
- Gayigeena oo xor ah
- Soomaali duntoo
- Hankii qaranka rumoobay
- Indhaha dunidaan arkayn
- Dhagaha ugurida
- Himilada dalkeena
- Berbera
- Hankaagu ha dhaafo reer hebel
- Xornimo sumadlaa
- Raali noqo dhulkaygow
- Dhulkaagaa lagu hoddmaa
- Bulshooy soo bixi cashuurta

== See also ==
- Waayaha Cusub
