= Mohamed Nuur Giriig =

Mohamed Nuur Giriig محمد نور غيريغ
- Born: Maxamed Nuur Giriig; 1935; Berbera, British Somaliland (now Somaliland)
- Origin: Somali
- Died: 2002 (aged 66–67) Hargeisa, Somaliland
- Genres: Somali music
- Instrument: vocals
- Years active: 1960s-1990s

Mohamed Nuur Giriig (Somali: Maxamed Nuur Giriig, Arabic: محمد نور غيريغ) (1935–2002) was a Somali singer, specializing in traditional Somali music.

== Biography ==
Giriig was born in 1935 in Berbera, now Somaliland to a Warsangali Darod family, originally from Las Khorey on the Maakhir Coast.

In 1954, he was among a group of auditioners, from which he was selected to join a troupe of Oud singers. Giriig's musical career began after that, which was marked by a number of hit songs. Most of the latter were recorded during the Somali music scene's Golden Age in the 1960s.

Giriig died in Hargeisa on January 17, 2002.

== Discography ==
Some of Giriig's all-time classic songs include:

- Timahaaga Dheeree
- Suleikha
- Dayaha I Dhibay Halay
- Maahee Khadraay
- Boodhari Sidiisii
- Wacad
- Gamaayeey
- Soomar

== See also ==
- Music of Somalia
