= Radio Hargeysa =

Radio station in Somaliland

Coordinates: 9.5716°N 44.0612°E

Radio Hargeisa
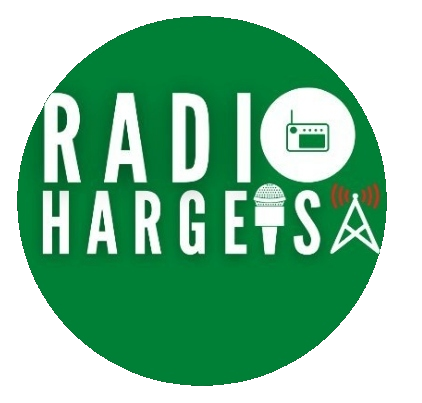

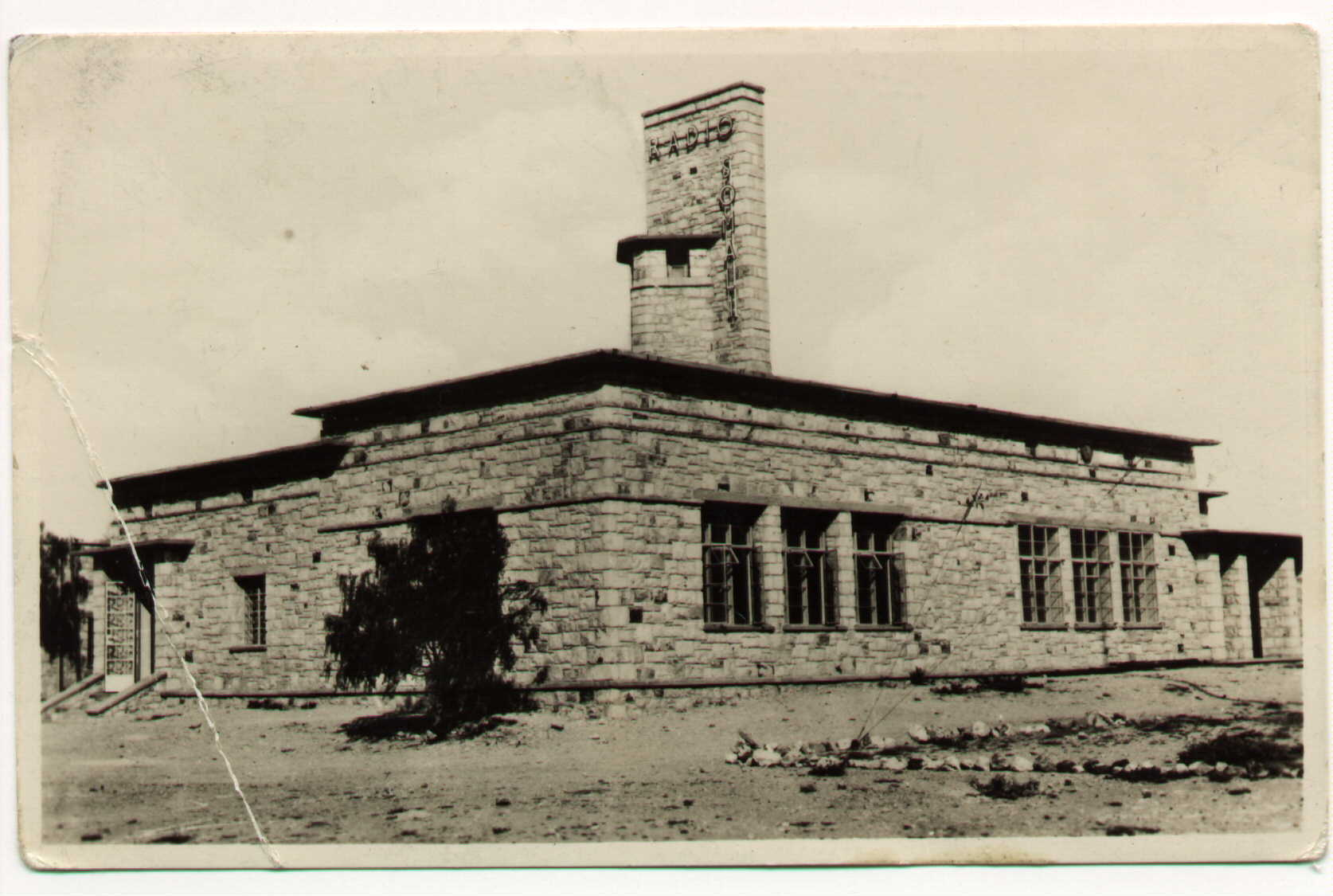
- Type: Broadcast
- Country: Somalia
- First air date: 1943
- Availability: National
- Headquarters: Hargeisa, Somalia, (De facto Somaliland)
- Owner: Government of Somaliland
- Launch date: 1943
- Official website: Official website
- Language: Somali, English,

Radio Hargeisa (Somali: Radio Hargeysa, is a Somaliland public service broadcaster. Its headquarters are at the Ministry of Information in Hargeisa.

== History ==
Established in 1943 in the former British Somaliland protectorate as the first Somali language station, it broadcasts mostly in Somali but also features news bulletins in Amharic, Arabic, and English. The channel was responsible for the widespread propagation of the new Balwo genre developed by Abdi Sinimo and the Heellooy oud music that Abdullahi Qarshe fused Balwo with.

== See also ==
- Media of Somaliland
- Ministry of Information and National Guidance (Somaliland)
- Dawan (newspaper)
- Somaliland National TV
- Somali music
- Abdullahi Qarshe
- Abdi Sinimo
- Ali Feiruz
