= Tinde =

Tinde may refer to:

- Tinde (ancient Macedonia), a city recorded in the 5th century BC
- Tinde Kovač Cerović (born 1954), Serbian educator and political figure
- Tinde van Andel, Dutch ethnobotanist
- Tinde, Tanzania, a ward in the Shinyanga Rural District
- Tinde, Zimbabwe, a village in Binga District
