= Khadra Dahir Ige =

Somaliland singer (1957–2022)

Khadra Dahir Cige خضرة طاهر عغه Khadro Daahir Cige
- Born: 1957; Hargeisa, British Somaliland
- Died: 2 July 2022 (aged 65) Hargeisa
- Genres: Somali music
- Years active: 1970s – 1980s
- Spouse: Axmed Cali Cigaal iyo Cabdullaahi Sabriye

Khadra Dahir Ige (Somali: Khadra Daahir Cige, Arabic: خضرة طاهر عغه) was a Somali singer, born in 1957 in Hargeisa. Khadra was one of Somali's most famous female stars during the 1970s and 1980s. She died June 2022 in Hargeisa at the age of 65.

== Biography ==
Khadra was born in 1957 in Hargeisa, the administrative center city of British Somaliland.

During Khadra's school years, she was a basketball player and competed in national tournaments.

Khadra debuted in 1974 at the age of 17 as a member of the dance unit Dabjecayl kari waa of the Somali music group Waaberi. According to Khadra's recollections, during the decade of the 1970s Somali became more tolerant of women becoming singers and began to gain popularity. Khadra became one of Somali's most famous female stars in the 1970s and 1980s.

Khadra retired as a singer in 2002.

After that, Khadra lived in Hargaysa, but occasionally traveled abroad to see her children.

Khadra was selected as number 3 of 15 artists among the "160 Great Somalis" selected by the Somaliland news website Berbera News in February 2012.

On June 25, 2022, Khadra died of pneumonia or leukemia at the International Hospital in Hargeisa at age 65.

== Music ==
Many of Khadra's songs are written by poet Hassan H. Abdullahi (Hassan Ganay).

- Afka lagama sheegto adigoon jeceyl arag (No words are spoken without love) - One of her best-known songs.
- Yabaal - 1975. Lyrics by Xasan-Ganey.
