= Waayaha Cusub =

Somali musical collective

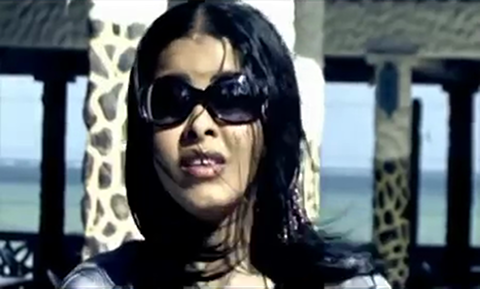
- Falis Abdi, lead vocalist for Waayaha Cusub.

Background information
- Origin: Somalia
- Genres: Somali music
- Years active: 2004–present

Waayaha Cusub ("The New Era") is a Somali musical collective. It is led by singer Falis Abdi. In 2013, the ensemble organized the Reconciliation Music Festival in Mogadishu, the first international music festival to be held in Somalia's capital since the start of the civil war in the early 1990s.

In October 2014, Abdi and her band applied for asylum in the Netherlands, where they had been performing a show in Amsterdam, after officials in Kenya revoked their immigration cards. Abdi was born in 1989

== See also ==
- Music of Somalia
- Flag of Somalia
