= Hibo Nura =

Somali singer

Hibo Nura هبو نورة خديجة قلنجو
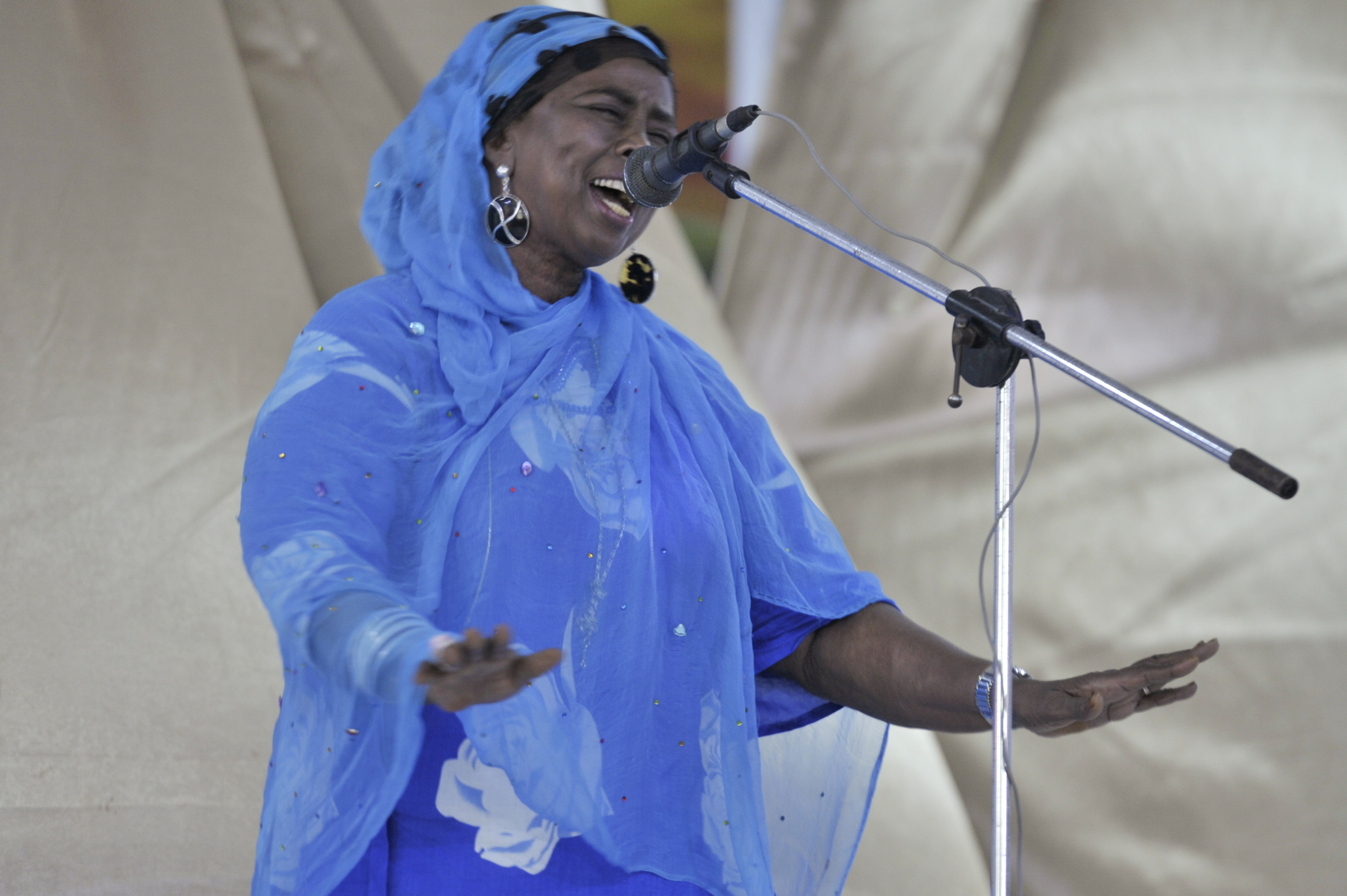
- Hibo Nura performs during the 54th Anniversary of the Somali National Army held at the Army Headquarters (April 12, 2014)

Background information
- Born: 21 May 1954 (age 72); Dilla, Somalia
- Genre: Somali music
- Occupations: singer, dancer
- Instrument: vocals
- Years active: 1960s – 1980s

Hibo Mohamed Hoddoon Cumar Cabsiiye, more famously known as Hibo Nura (Somali: Hibo Nuura, Hibo Maxamed Nuur), is one of the most prominent Somali singers born in 1954.

== History ==
Hibo Mohamed Hudon, known as Hibo Nuura was born in Dilla, Awdal in 1954. She is a member of the Reer Nuur sub-clan of the Samaroon. Nuura began her music career as a teenager in 1968. She gained popularity as a member of the Somali musical supergroup Waaberi in the 1970s, and became known for her renditions of love songs and patriotic, nationalist songs. Her career spanned nearly 50 years, and in that time she became one of the most respected Somali women singers.

Beginning around 1992, Nuura moved abroad. She lived in Minneapolis, Minnesota and was a judge for a sambusa cook-off in 2011. She returned to Mogadishu 22 years later, in September 2014.

In early 2015, Nuura participated in a global teleconference call with Somali mullahs. They pressured her to end her singing career, insisting that singing accompanied by music is haram. Nuura announced that she would leave the music industry in February 2015 for the sake of Allah. She asked that people not listen to her songs, but indicated that she would continue to sing national, patriotic songs.
