= Abdi Sinimo =

Abdi Sinimo سِنِيمُو
- Born: Cabdi Deeqsi Warfaa; 1920; Jarahorato, Somaliland
- Died: 1967 (aged 46–47) Djibouti
- Genre: Somali music
- Occupations: Poet, singer, songwriter, and musical innovator
- Instrument: vocals
- Years active: 1940s-1970s

Abdi Sinimo (Somali: Cabdi Siniimoo, Arabic: سنيمو) (born 1920, died 1967) was a Somali singer, songwriter, poet and musical innovator. Known as "Father of Somali Music", he is noted for having established the Balwo genre of Somali music, which was the forerunner of the Heelo genre and thus gave birth to modern Somali music.

== Early years ==
Sinimo was born in the 1920s in Jaarahorato, an historical village situated 25 miles (40 km) north-east of the present Borama, Somaliland. He hailed from the Reer Nuur clan. He was the fourth son in a family of 18 children, consisting of nine boys and nine girls. Even though born in Borama district at that time, he spent most of his life in Djibouti working for the Djibouti Port Authority as a driver of a transshipment truck from Djibouti city to Addis Ababa, via Dire Dawa.

== Music career ==
In an interview with Abdullahi Qarshe published by Bildhaan Vol. 2 page 80, he affirmed that "modern music was in the air at the time of Abdi Sinimo, who is widely regarded as the genius who formulated and organized it into the belwo and thus took well deserved credit and honor for it."

The first band Sinimo created was in Borama during 1944 when he retired from driving and went into music full-time. It was called Balwo. Members of his band were:

- Abdi Deqsi Warfa (Abdi Sinimo)
- Kobali Ashad
- Hussen Are Mead
- Hashi Warsame
- Khadija Eye Dharar (Khadija Balwo)
- Nuriya Atiq

Below is a sample from a poem by Abdi Sinimo which he first hummed while repairing a broken truck in 1943. This came to start the Balwo-genre and Northern Somali song tradition.

Balwoy! Hoy balwoy Waha i baleyey mooyaan Waha i baleyey babur Waha i baleyey berguba. . . .

Translation: (Balwoy! O' Balwoy I know not what made me suffer It is a truck that made me suffer She is berguba [a girl's name] who made me suffer. . . .)

— Abdi Sinimo, Historical Dictionary of Somalia, 2003
