= Somali art =

Somali art is the artistic culture of the Somali people, both historic and contemporary. These include artistic traditions in pottery, music, architecture, woodcarving and other genres. Somali art is characterized by its aniconism, partly as a result of the vestigial influence of the pre-Islamic mythology of the Somalis coupled with their ubiquitous Muslim beliefs. However, there have been cases in the past of artistic depictions representing living creatures such as the golden birds on the Mogadishan canopies, the ancient rock paintings in Somaliland, and the plant decorations on religious tombs in Somalia, but these are considered rare. Instead, intricate patterns and geometric designs, bold colors and monumental architecture was the norm.

== History ==
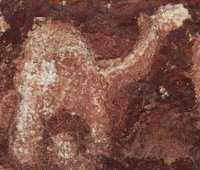
Ancient rock art depicting a camel.

The oldest evidence of art in the Somali peninsula are pre-historic rock paintings. The rock art of Laas Geel are thought to be some of the best preserved in Africa, representing cows in ceremonial robes accompanied by humans. The necks of the cows are embellished with a kind of plastron, some of the cows are depicted as wearing decorative robes. The paintings not only show cows, but also a domesticated dogs, several paintings of canidae and a giraffe.

Aspects of ancient Somali styles of architecture and art can be seen in the various Somali civilizations that flourished under Islam, particularly during the Mogadishan Golden Age and the Empire of Ajuran period (especially in the domain of architecture). In the early modern and contemporary era, poetry and theatrical ventures shaped much of today's Somali artistic culture.

=== Carving ===
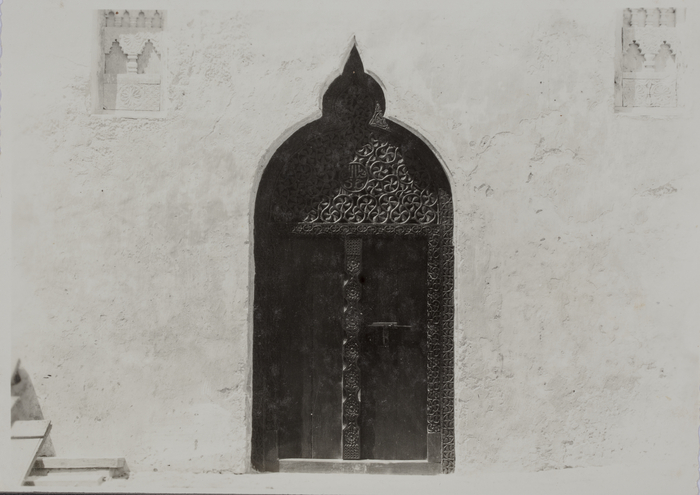
Traditional doorway

Carving, known in Somali as qoris, is a much respected profession in Somalia both in historic and modern times. Many wealthy urbanites in the medieval period regularly employed the finest wood and marble carvers in Somalia to work on their interiors and houses. The carvings on the mihrabs and pillars of ancient Somali mosques are some of the oldest on the continent. Artistic carving was considered the province of men similar to how the Somali textile industry was mainly a women's business. Amongst the nomads, carving, especially woodwork, was widespread and could be found on the most basic objects such as spoons, combs and bowls, but it also included more complex structures such as the portable nomadic house, the aqal. In the last several decades, traditional carving of windows, doors and furniture has taken a backseat to the introduction of workshops employing electrical machinery which deliver the same results in a far shorter time period.

=== Textile ===
The textile culture of Somalia is an ancient one, and the Somali textile center in Mogadishu was, from at least the 13th century to the late 19th century, considered to be one of the main textile hubs in the Indian Ocean. It competed with those of the Indians and later the Americans in domestic and foreign markets such as Egypt and Syria.

=== Metalwork ===
The goldsmiths and blacksmiths of the urban cities, though often shunned by the dominant nomadic culture for their occupation, fashioned the city-dwellers' traditional display of wealth and power through ornaments such as jewelry in the case of women, or the intricately designed Somali dagger (toraay) in the case of men.

=== Architecture ===
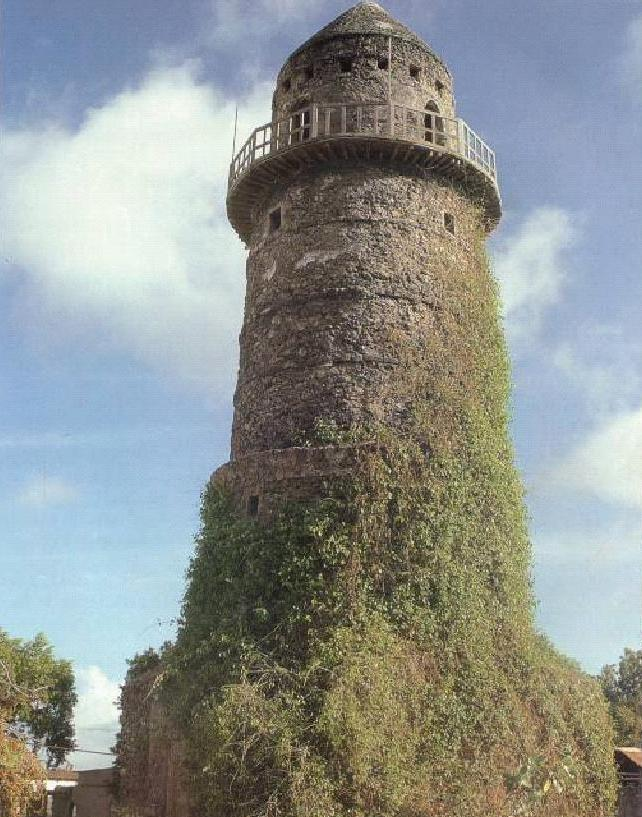
Almnara Tower in Mogadishu, Somalia.

Somali architecture is a rich and diverse tradition of engineering and designing multiple different construction types such as stone cities, castles, citadels, fortresses, mosques, temples, aqueducts, lighthouses, towers and tombs during the ancient, medieval and early modern periods in Somalia, as well as the fusion of Somalo-Islamic architecture with Occidental designs in contemporary times.

In ancient Somalia, pyramidical structures known in Somali as taalo were a popular burial style, with hundreds of these drystone monuments scattered around the country today. Houses were built of dressed stone similar to the ones in Ancient Egypt, and there are examples of courtyards and large stone walls such as the Wargaade Wall enclosing settlements.

The adoption of Islam in the early medieval era of Somalia's history brought Islamic architectural influences from Arabia and Persia, which stimulated a shift from drystone and other related materials in construction to coral stone, sundried bricks, and the widespread use of limestone in Somali architecture. Many of the new architectural designs such as mosques were built on the ruins of older structures, a practice that would continue over and over again throughout the following centuries.
