= Mohamed Sulayman Tubeec =

Mohamed Saleban Tubeec
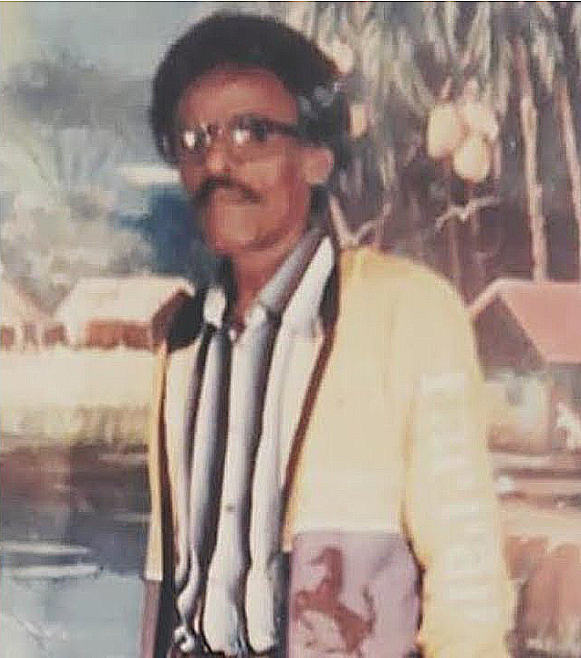

Background information
- Born: Mohamed Saleban Tubeec; 21 May 1943; Laaleys, Berbera, British Somaliland (now Somaliland)
- Died: 11 March 2014 (aged 70) Munich, Germany
- Genres: Somali music
- Occupation: Musician artist
- Instruments: Singing
- Years active: 1959–2013
- Labels: Walaalaha Hargeisa, Waaberi
- Website: somali-music.com/artists/mahamed-tubeec

Mohamed Saleban Tubeec (Somali: Maxamed Saleebaan Tubeec), (1941– 11 March 2014) was a Somali singer, songwriter and record producer.

== Personal life ==
Tubeec was born in 1941 in the town of Laaleys near Berbera, situated in British Somaliland (now Somaliland). During his teenage years he lived in Berbera, Hargeisa and Burao where he grew up. His father, Saleban Tubeec, was a blacksmith. Tubeec hailed Madhibaan Somali clan. His mother, Shaqlan Omar Salim, descended from a Hadhrami family from Hami, Yemen. He was the second oldest of four children, three boys and one girl. In 1959 Tubeec moved to Djibouti with his older brother Jama Tubeec, who was a singer as well, where he also started his career as a singer.

== Career ==
In 1960 Tubeec returned to Hargeisa where he joined the Walaalaha Hargeisa music band led by Abdullahi Qarshe. Tubeec's art was noted for its emphasis on political justice. He used to sing for the Somali independence during the 1960s with the Walaalaha Hargeisa.

After the independence and Unification of the Somali Republic, Tubeec moved to Mogadishu with members of Waaberi group. After the start of the Somali civil war in the 1990s Tubeec relocated to Djibouti then Kolding Denmark where he introduced his latest album Nasteexo. In April 2013 Tubeec made his last song (Laxan) Melody "Iisoo dhawaaw" by Hodan Abdirahman ft. Abdifatah Yare.

== Death ==
On 11 March 2014 he died in a hospital in Germany. On 16 March 2014, the Federal Government of Somalia held a state funeral in honour of Tubeec. Cabinet ministers, legislators, popular artists and former colleagues all attended the funeral service, where Janaza prayers were read. Tubeec was subsequently laid to rest at General Kaahiye Cemetery in Mogadishu, Somalia.

== Discography ==
- Hooyo iyo aabbe
- Nasteexo
- Deeqa
- Diiriyoow
- Ammaanada ilaahay
- Gufaaco
- Alla maanta ayaanta
- Aramidu
- Waqti

== See also ==
- Maryam Mursal
- Abdullahi Qarshe
- Music of Somalia
