= Jarahorato =

Town in Awdal, Somaliland

- Town
- Location within Awdal Location within Somaliland
- Coordinates: 9°50′38″N 43°19′49″E
- Country: Somaliland
- Region: Awdal
- District: Borama
- Time zone: UTC+3 (EAT)
- Climate: BSh

Jarahorato (also: Dzharakhorato, Jaaraahorato, Jaarrahorrato) is a village in the northwestern Awdal region of Somaliland.

== History ==
According to local folklore, it is named after a legendary King and Queen who ruled this land before the Somali conquest of this region. The King was known as Jara and his wife was known as Horato.

== Demographics ==
The town is exclusively inhabited by the Mohamuud Nuur, one of the two sub divisions of Reer Nuur, a subclan of the Gadabuursi.

I.M. Lewis (1982) states that the Reer Mohamuud Nuur began cultivating in Jarahorato as early as 1911:

"The Gadabuursi Reer Mahammad Nuur, for example, are said to have begun cultivating in 1911 at Jara Horoto to the east of the present town of Borama."
