= Sahra Halgan =

Somalian singer

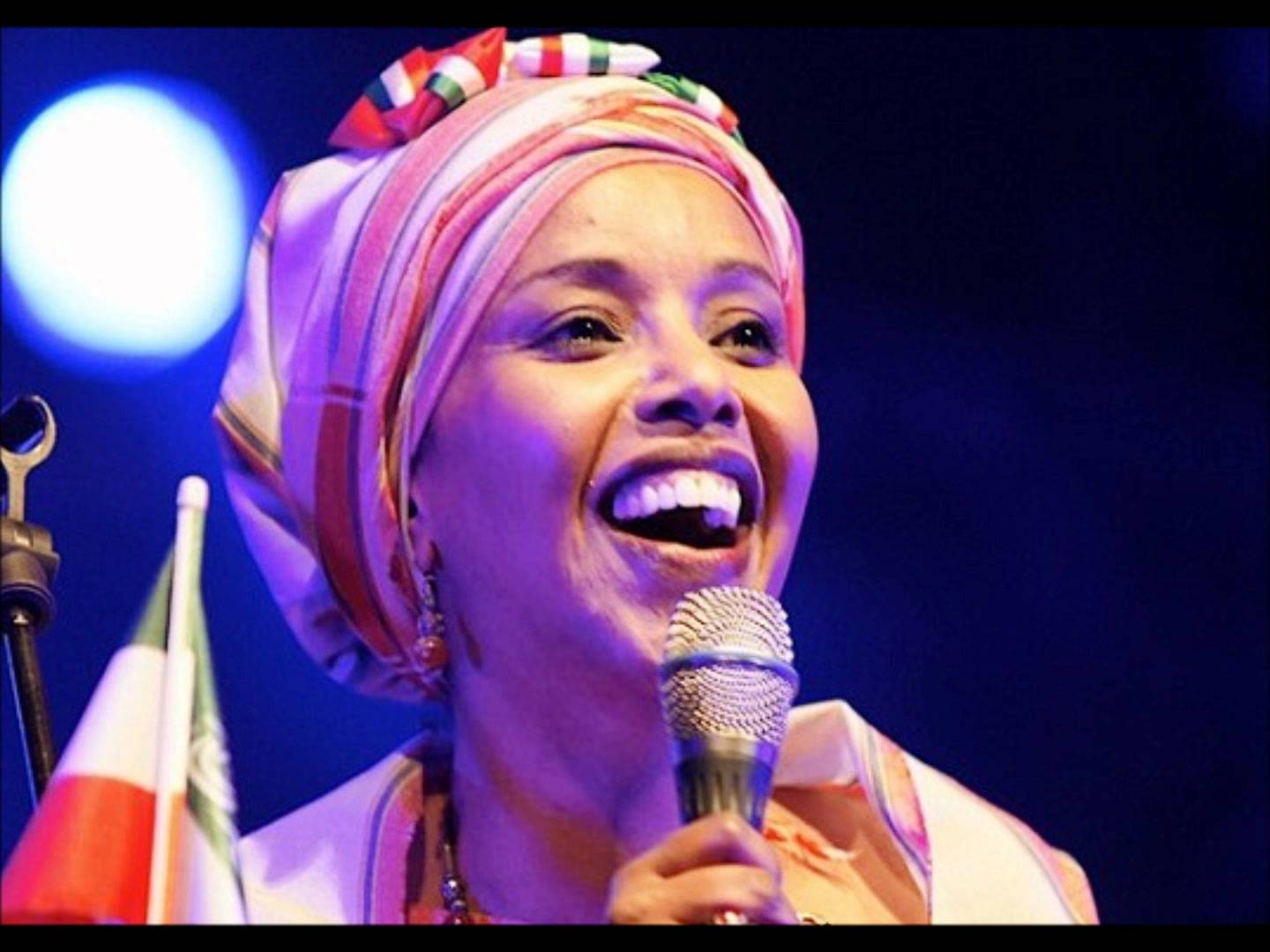
- Born: Sahra Ahmed Mohamoud; Sahra Axmed Maxamuud; 12 April 1972 (age 53); Hargeisa, Somaliland
- Occupations: Singer-songwriter; record producer
- Years active: 2009–present
- Musical career
- Genres: Pop; Country
- Instruments: Vocals; guitar; drums
- Labels: Hiddo Dhawr

Sahra Ahmed Mohamoud (Somali: Sahra Axmed Maxamuud) is a Somali singer and cultural activist, also known as professionally Sahra Halgan as her stage name .

== Biography ==
Halgan was born in 1972 in Hargeisa, Somalia, at the time led by Mohamed Siad Barre. At 13 years old, she began to sing. Performing on the stage and singing in public was frowned upon by her community, but she persisted. The Somali civil war broke out in the late 1970s against Barre. Resistance movements, supported by the Ethiopian government, began to develop. The Somali National Movement (SNM), in particular, seized Burao and Hargeisa. In 1988, Barré decided to put an end to the rebellion by force and launched a heavy bombing campaign focusing on Hargeisa. Halgan, who was only 16 years old and had no previous training, worked as a nurse for the SNM.

She said, "At the front, I was finally free. The soldiers had other things to do than forbid me to sing." Barré was removed from power on 26 January 1991.

== Career ==
Halgan then left to take refuge in Europe and recuperate, and settled in Lyon. She was granted political refugee status. She worked odd jobs in the city, getting involved in neighborhood life and returning to music. In 2009, she released her first album, Somaliland. Following that, she worked on a second project, a trio with percussionist Aymeric Krol and guitarist Maël Salètes, who had met in Lyon. Her second album, Faransiskiyo Somaliland, was released in 2015. The music combined Tuareg rock and East African rhythms.

In 2015, she returned to live in Somaliland after going back and forth between her native region and France. She founded a cultural center devoted to music and poetry in Hargeisa, her hometown and capital of Somaliland. She released a third album, Waa Dardaaran, in 2019.
