= Balwo =

Style of music and poetry practiced in Somalia, Somaliland and Djibouti

Balwo (Arabic: بلوه) is a style of music and poetry practiced in Somalia as well as Djibouti. Its lyrical contents often deal with love and passion. The Balwo genre was founded by Abdi Sinimo.

== Origins ==
The Balwo genre was founded by Abdi Sinimo, a Somali of the Reer Nuur subclan of the Gadabuursi. The first Heelo (Which is considered a sub genre of Balwo) was brought fourth by Abdi Sinimo as well.

In 1945, while working as a lorry driver for the Djiboutian Port Authority, Abdi Sinimo was driving his truck and had experienced misfortune when around the Zeila area, thus the first Balwo was created. He called it "Balwo" (meaning misfortune in Somali), because of the remoteness of where his truck had experienced difficulty. The Balwo is a simple love lyric that has revolutionized modern Somali music. Another artist who made significant contributions to the genre was Abdullahi Qarshe, who is credited with the introduction of the kaban (oud) as an accompaniment to Somali music.

In an interview with Abdullahi Qarshe, he affirmed that "modern music was in the air at the time of Abdi Sinimo, who is widely regarded as the genius who formulated and organized it into the belwo and thus took well deserved credit and honor for it."

== History ==
Abdi Deeqsi (Abdi Sinimo) was born in a place in the Borama area named Jarahorato, where he spent most of his youth. Unlike the overwhelming majority of Somali poets, his family were never rural nomad in the Somali bush, living in the traditional manner; Abdi Deqsi and his family was urbanized from the beginning. Early in youth, he went to Djibouti (At the time was known as French Somaliland) where he studied about vehicle mechanics as an apprentice. After returning to Borama around 1941, he was employed as a lorry driver mechanic by a wealthy merchant, by the name of Haji Hirsi.

By now, Abdi had passed his thirtieth birthday and had acquired the nickname Sinimo (Cinema in Somali). Abdi was a well known orator of stories and jokes because of his passion to deliver the story, the nickname fit him extremely well. His outgoing personality made him very popular, especially among the youth. Abdi's trade route took him from Zeila, to Djibouti to Borama and Hargeysa and sometimes even as far away as Dire Dhabe in Ethiopia. One day, sometime between 1943 and 1945, his lorry broke down in the bush. Somali oral tradition debates the whereabouts of this happening. Some say it occurred in a place called Habaas; others say in Ban Balcad; while still others claim the place was Selel on the plain of Geryaad, thirty miles south of Zeila. Abdi was unable to determine what was wrong with his vehicle and was thus unable to repair it. Finally after much frustrating work and failed repair, he sat down and (as the Somali poet Hasan Sheekh Muumin states) these words escaped from his mouth: "Belwooy, belwooy, hooy belwooy....Waha i baleeyay mooyaane. Belwooy, belwooy, hooy belwooy!" (I am unaware of what caused me to suffer)

The following variation is also sometimes quoted as the first Balwo by some Somalis: "Balwooy, hooy balwooy, Waha ii balweeyay mooyaane, Waha i balweeyay baabuure, Balwooy, hoy balwooy !" ( I am unaware of what caused me to suffer; What caused me to suffer was a lorry.)

When Abdi returned to Borama after having his lorry towed back to Zeila, he recited his short poem in public. It was an immediate success which inspired him to compose other Balwo. Other poets also began to compose in the new genre, and it began to spread rapidly.

Below is a sample of a poem written Abdi Sinimo.

Balwooy! Hoy balwooy
Waxaa i baleeyey mooyaan
Waxaa i baleeyey baabuur
Waxaa i baleeyey berguba.

— Abdi Sinimo
Translation:

Balwoy! O Balwoy
I know not what made me suffer
It is a truck that made me suffer
She is berguba [a girl's name] who made me suffer.

== Controversy ==
Balwo was becoming increasing popular, with members of the upper class in northern Somali towns hosting Balwo listening parties. This rapid expansion of the Balwo genre, after its establishment, caused many members of Somali religious orders to speak out against it.

Religious leaders such as Shaykh Abdullah Mijlrtain and Muhammad Hassan, started to compose poems against the spread of Balwo. Their position was, the singing of love poems of the Somali Balwo genre is offensive to Muslim morality and decorum, and is against Islamic morals. Nonetheless, the spread of the genre did not stop, Abdi established a troop and performed the genre in many cities in Somalia, thus becoming a modern Somali music innovator.

== Influence on Somali Music ==
Balwo, was the immediate predecessor of the Heello, and thus Heelo become a sub genre of Balwo. Abdi's innovation and passion for music revolutionized Somali music forever.
