= Abdullahi Qarshe =

Somali musician, poet and playwright (1924–1994)

Abdullahi Qarshe عبدالله قرشي
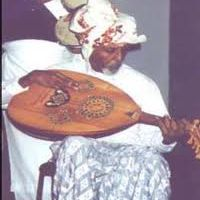

Background information
- Born: Cabdilaahi Qarshe; 1924; Moshi, Tanganyika Territory (present-day Tanzania)
- Origin: Somalia
- Died: 1994 (aged 69–70) United Kingdom
- Genres: Balwo, Heello, Qaraami
- Instruments: Oud, piano, guitar, lute kaban
- Years active: 1940s–1970s
- Label: Wadani

Abdullahi Qarshe (Somali: Cabdilaahi Qarshe, Arabic: عبد الله قرشي) (1924–1994) was a Somali musician, poet and playwright known as the "Father of Somali music". In 1957 he wrote and composed the Somali National Anthem, Qolobaa Calankeed.

== Biography ==
=== Early life ===
Qarshe was born in 1924 in the Somali expatriate community in Moshi, Tanzania. He belonged to the Mousa Arreh subdivision of the Habar Yoonis sub clan of Garhajis Isaaq that mainly inhabits the Togdheer region in north Somalia (de facto Somaliland ). Before migrating to Tanzania, his family was based in the town of Maydh, Sanaag region in north of Somalia, where they were the keepers of the tomb of Shaykh Ishaaq, the common progenitor of the wider Isaaq clan.

In 1931, at the behest of his family, he left Tanzania and settled in Aden, Yemen for his education, where he subsequently memorized the entire Quran. In Aden, Abdullahi also had his first encounter with cinema and radio playing western films and Indian and Arabic music, which inspired him to buy a lute to accomplish his new goal of creating music in the Somali language. He was married to Adaiya Qarshe with whom he had four children: Rukiyo Qarshe, Safiyo Qarshe, Anab Qarshe and Mahad Qarshe.

=== Career ===
Qarshe, along with other first-generation artists such as Ali Feiruz and Mohamed Nahari, was among the pioneers of modern Somali music. An innovative musician, Qarshe often employed a wide variety of instruments, such as the guitar, piano and oud. He was also known for his poems and theatrical work at Mogadishu and Hargeisa venues.

The Balwo genre, was however founded by Abdi Sinimo as was mentioned by Qarshe. In an interview with Abdullahi Qarshe published by Bildhaan Vol. 2, page 80, he affirmed that "modern music was in the air at the time of Abdi Sinimo, who is widely regarded as the genius who formulated and organized it into the belwo and thus took well deserved credit and honor for it."

==== Heellooy ====
Qarshe introduced a new and shorter form of Heello by combining traditional Somali poetry with song. In the 1940s he created his first song Ka ka'ay (Arise). Qarshe utilized many of his Heello songs to express pro-independence and anti-colonial sentiments. In tribute to Patrice Lumumba he wrote the song Lumumba ma noole mana dhimane (Lumumba is neither alive nor dead) in 1960 . In 1957 he composed the current Somali National Anthem Qoloba Calankeeda waa cayn (Every nation has its own unique flag). In 1955 Qarshe founded the Walaalo Hargeisa troupe which performed various plays around then British Somaliland, one of them being Soomaalidii Hore iyo Somaalidii dambe (Somalis past and present). Qarshe's 1961 song Aqoon la'aan waa iftiin la'aan(to be without knowledge is to be without light) was the signature tune of Radio Mogadishu. In addition, Qarshe was a member of the pioneering Somali musical ensemble Waaberi and would influence nearly all subsequent Heellooy.

=== Trivia ===
In 1957 when working at Radio Hargesia he was asked to compose the signature tune for BBC Somalia for which he used a melody he originally wrote to the words of an anti-colonial poem. The signature tune is still in use.

== See also ==
- Radio Hargeisa
- Music of Somaliland
- Music of Somalia
- Ali Feiruz
- Abdi Sinimo
