= Music of Somalia =

Music of Somalia (Somali: Muusiga Soomaaliya) is music following the musical styles, techniques and sounds of the Somali people.

== Overview ==
=== Traditional Somali music ===
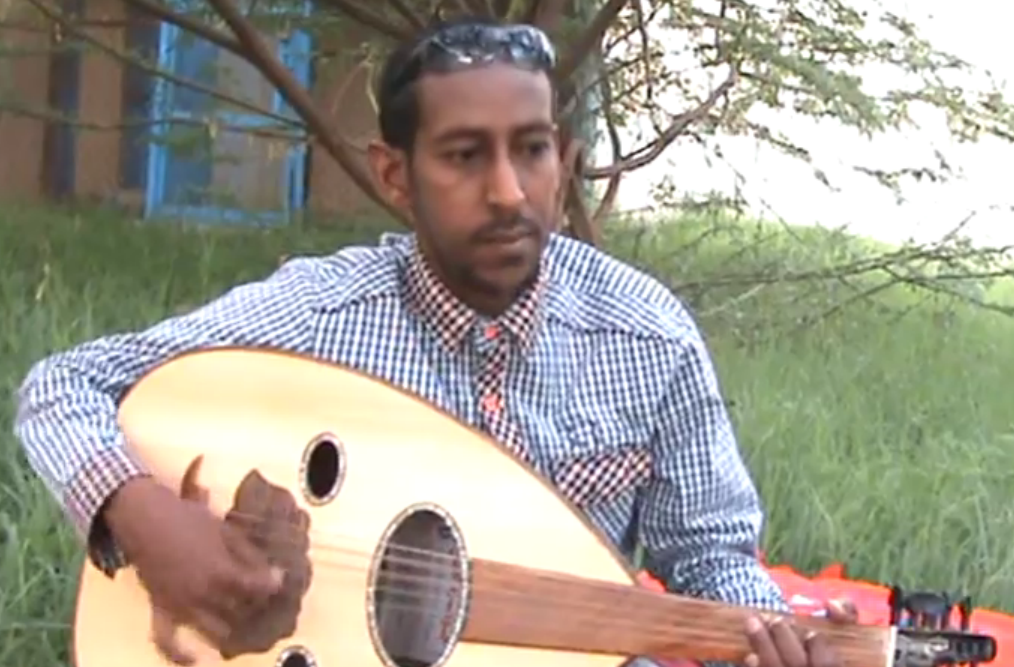
Somali oud player Nuruddin Ali Amaan.

Somali people have a rich musical heritage centered on traditional Somali folklore.

Somali songs are pentatonic. That is, they only use five pitches per octave in contrast to a heptatonic (seven note) scale such as the major scale. At first listen, Somali music might be mistaken for the sounds of nearby regions such as Oromo in Ethiopia, Sudan or the Arabian Peninsula, but it is ultimately recognizable by its own unique tunes and styles. Somali songs are usually the product of collaboration between lyricists (lahamiste), songwriters (abwaan), and vocalists (odka or "voice"). The Somali word for dance is ciyaar.

Traditional instruments prominently featured in the music of Somalia include the oud lute (kaban). It is often accompanied by small drums and a reed flute in the background. However, heavy percussion and metallic sounds are uncommon within Somalia. The riverine and coastal areas of Somalia use a wide variety of traditional instruments including:

- Membranophones: nasaro, mokhoddon and masoondhe (high and heavy drums), reeme, jabbu and yoome (small drums);
- Aerophones: malkad and siinbaar (flutes), sumaari (double clarinet), fuugwo (trumpet) buun, muufe and gees-goodir (horns);
- Idiophones: shagal (metal clappers), shanbaal (wooden clappers), shunuuf (vegetable ankle rattles), tenegyo (xylophone);
- Chordophones: shareero (lyre), kinaandha (lute), madhuube (thumb piano), seese (one-chord violin)

== History ==
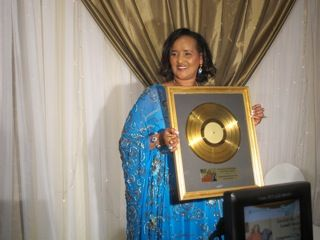
Somali singer Saado Ali Warsame receiving a Gold Record, Lifetime Achievement Award.

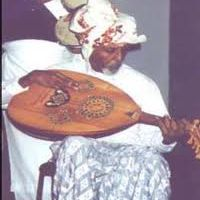
Abdullahi Qarshe, popularly known as the father of Somali music.

Somali popular music began with the balwo style, pioneered by Abdi Sinimo, who rose to fame in the early 1940s. This new genre then in turn created the Heelo style of Somali music. Abdi's innovation and passion for music revolutionized Somali music forever.

Introduction of melody in modern Somali song is credited to Abdullahi Qarshe, who is recognised for introducing the kaban (oud) as an accompaniment to Somali music. Qarshe is revered by Somalis as "father of Somali music".

Many qaraami songs from this era are still extremely popular today. This musical style is mostly played on the kaban (oud). Prominent Somali kaban players of the 1950s include Ali Feiruz and Mohamed Nahari.

During the rule of the Supreme Revolutionary Council (Somalia), music was suppressed except for a small amount of officially sanctioned music. There were many protest songs produced during this period, pioneered by the people of Somaliland who were trying to gain independence from the government of Somalia, especially the genocidal Barre regime.

Bands such as Waaberi and Horseed have gained a small following outside of the country. Others, like Ahmed Ali Egal, Maryam Mursal and Waayaha Cusub have fused traditional Somali music with pop, rock and roll, bossa nova, jazz, and other modern influences.

Music recorded in the 1970s was preserved in Hargeisa, buried underground, and is now available at the Red Sea Foundation at the Hargeisa Cultural Center, and in Radio Hargeisa. The Barre dictatorial regime effectively nationalised the music scene, with bands and production under state control. Bands were operated by the police, the army and the national penitentiary. Female singers were encouraged more than was the case in most of East Africa. Most musicians had left the country before 1991. Hiddo Dhawr is now operating as the only live music venue in the city.

== Music institutions ==
The first radio station in Somalia to air popular Somali music was Radio Kudu based in Hargeisa, modern-day Somaliland. The first song to be broadcast was composed by Guroon Jire in 1940 in English, Somali before being renamed the following year to Radio Somali. The head of the Music department was Mohamed Saeed (Guroon jire). Music is now regularly broadcast on the state-run Radio Hargeisa, a number of private studios, including Sony Music Somaliland, a division of Sony Music Entertainment as well radio and popular television networks, such as Horn Cable Television (a private company based in Somaliland).

== List of Somali musicians and musical groups ==
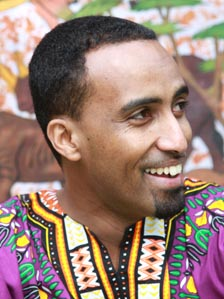
Popular Somali singer Aar Maanta.

- Aar maanta
- Abdi Sinimo
- Abdullahi Qarshe
- Ahmed Gacayte
- Ahmed Mooge Liban
- Dur-Dur Band
- Guduuda 'Arwo
- Hasan Adan Samatar
- Hassan Sheikh Mumin
- Hibo Nura
- Ilkacase Qays
- Jiim Sheikh Muumin
- Khadija Qalanjo
- K'naan
- Mohamed Nuur Giriig
- Saado Ali Warsame
- Waayaha Cusub
- Mohamed Sulayman Tubeec
- Hudeidi
- Xiddigaha Geeska
- Naji The Pilot

== See also ==
- Middle Eastern music
- Music of Ethiopia
