= Khadija =

- Pronunciation: Arabic: [xaˈdiːdʒa] Egyptian Arabic: [xæˈdiːɡɑ]
- Gender: Female

Origin
- Origin: From Khadija bint Khuwaylid, first wife of Muhammad
- Meaning: Premature
- Region of origin: Arabia

Other names
- Related names: Khadijah, Khadeeja, Khadeejah, Khatija, Khatijah, Katijah, Hadja, Hatice, Tijah

Khadija, Khadijah, Khadeeja, Khatija, or Khatijah (Arabic: خديجة, romanized: Khadīja) is a feminine given name of Arabic origin. It is the name of Khadija bint Khuwaylid, the first wife of the Islamic prophet Muhammad. In 1995, it was one of the three most popular Arabic female given names in the Muslim world, along with Fatima and Aisha. Hatice is the Turkish equivalent. Notable people with the name include:

== Given name ==
=== Khadeeja ===
- Khadeeja (actress) (1939/40–2017), Indian film actress
- Khadeeja Abdul Samad Abdulla, Maldivian politician

=== Khadija ===
- Khadijah of the Maldives (died 1379/80), Sultana of the Maldives
- Khadija Abbouda (born 1968), Moroccan athlete
- Khadija Abeba, Djiboutian judge
- Khadija Begi Agha (1451–??), Timurid royal consort
- Khadija Zahra Ahmadi, Afghan politician
- Khadijatou Bint Ahmed, Mauritanian politician
- Khadija Ahrari, Afghan politician
- Khadija Alibeyova (1884–1961), Azerbaijani editor
- Khadijah Ameen (born 1981), Trinidadian and Tobagonian politician
- Khadija Amin, Bangladesh politician
- Khadija Arib (born 1960), Dutch politician
- Khadija Arslan, Seljuk princess
- Khadija Assad (1952–2023), Moroccan actress and comedian
- Khadija Abdalla Bajaber, Kenyan poet and novelist
- Khadija Baker, Syrian-Canadian interdisciplinary artist
- Khadija Begum, Aq Qoyunlu princess
- Khadija Benguenna (born 1965), Algerian journalist and TV presenter
- Khadija Besikri (born 1962), Libyan poet, writer, and human rights activist
- Khadija El Bidaouia (1953–2022), Moroccan singer
- Khadija Chunga (born 1991), Malawian politician
- Khadija Ciss (born 1983), Senegalese swimmer
- Khadija Abdullahi Daleys (1936–2018), Somali singer
- Khadijah Dare (born 1991), British-Nigerian terrorist
- Khadijah Farrakhan (1935–2026), wife of Louis Farrakhan
- Khadija Gayibova (1893–1938), Azerbaijani pianist
- Khadija Gbla (born 1988), Australian anti-FGM campaigner
- Khadija Al Hanafi, Tunisian footwork music producer
- Khadijah Hashim (born 1942), Malaysian journalist and teacher
- Khadijah Ibrahiim, Jamaican-British literary activist, theatre maker, and writer
- Khadija Abba Ibrahim (born 1967), Nigerian politician
- Khadija Ikan (born 1972), Moroccan writer
- Khadija Ismayilova (born 1976), Azerbaijani journalist
- Khadija Jaballah (born 1974), Tunisian Paralympic athlete
- Khadija Jlassi (born 2003), Tunisian freestyle wrestler
- Khadija Arslan Khatun, wife of 11th-century caliph al-Qa'im, mother of prince Muhammad bin Qa'im
- Khadija bint Khuwaylid (554–619), first wife of Muhammad
- Khadija Krimi (born 1995), Tunisian rower
- Khadija Tul Kubra (born 1995), Bangladeshi cricketer
- Khadija Lalla (born 2007), Moroccan princess
- Khadija Al Makhzoumi, Somali diplomat and politician
- Khadija Aamir Yar Malik, Pakistani politician
- Khadija El-Mardi (born 1991), Moroccan boxer
- Khadija Marouazi (born 1961), Moroccan human rights activist, writer, and university lecturer
- Khadija Mastoor (1927–1982), Pakistani Urdu-language short story writer and novelist
- Khadijah Mellah (born 2000), British horse race jockey
- Khadija Mohammed (born 1995), Emirati weightlifter
- Khadija Mumtaz (born 1955), Indian writer
- Khadija Mushtaq (1974–2025), Pakistani academic administrator and educator
- Khadija Oussat, Moroccan footballer
- Khadija Patel, South African investigative journalist
- Khadija Qalanjo (1950–2025), Somali singer and dancer
- Khadija Salum Ally Al-Qassmy (born 1958), Tanzanian politician
- Khadijah Queen (born 1975), American poet
- Khadijah Rivera (1950–2009), American Latina Muslim activist
- Khadija Riyad (1914–1981), Egyptian painter, sculptor, and jewelry designer
- Khadija Er-Rmichi (born 1989), Moroccan footballer
- Khadijah Rushdan (born 1988), American basketball player
- Khadija Ryadi (born 1960), Moroccan human rights and feminist activist
- Khadija al-Salami (born 1966), Yemeni film producer
- Khadija Saye (1992–2017), Gambian-British photographer
- Khadijah Shah, Pakistani American fashion designer and activist
- Khadija Sharife (born 1986), South African journalist and author
- Khadija Shaw (born 1997), Jamaican footballer
- Khadijah Sidek (1918–1982), Malay nationalist and politician
- Khadija Sufian, Bangladeshi politician
- Khadija Sultana (1600–??), Indian regent
- Khadija Umar (born 1975), Pakistani politician
- Khadija Uzhakhova (born 1996), Russian women, wife of Russian-British businessman Said Gutseriev
- Khadijah Whittington (born 1986), American basketball player
- Khadijah Williams (born 1994), Jamaican netball player

=== Khatija ===
- Khatija Rahman (born 1995), Indian music composer and singer
- Khatijah Surattee (born 1950), Singaporean sports shooter
- Khatijah Yusoff (born 1956), Malaysian academic and a virologist

== Fictional people ==
- Khadija, a character in the comedy-drama Paris (2008 film)
- Khadijah Adiyeme, played by Lupita Nyong'o in The 355
- Khadijah James, character in the television series Living Single
- Khadijah, a character in the song of the same name, released in 1993 by hip hop trio Dirt Nation.

== See also ==
- Khadija (disambiguation)
- Meccan boycott of the Hashemites
