= Khadija (disambiguation) =

Khadija is a given name, the name of Khadija bint Khuwaylid, first wife of Muhammad.

It may also refer to:

== People ==
=== Historical figures ===
- Hatice Sultan (daughter of Selim I), Ottoman princess, daughter of Sultan Selim I and Hafsa Sultan. Sister of Sultan Suleiman the Magnificent
- Hatice Sultan (daughter of Mehmed IV) (1660–1743), Ottoman princess
- Hatice Sultan (daughter of Ahmed III), (1710–1738) 18th-century Ottoman princess
- Hatice Sultan (daughter of Mustafa III) (1768–1822), Ottoman princess
- Hatice Sultan (daughter of Murad V) (1870–1938), Ottoman princess
- Mahfiruz Hatice Sultan (1590–1607/10), mother of Ottoman Sultan Osman II
- Khadija Sultana (1600– fl. 1665), Indian regent
- Turhan Hatice Sultan (1627–1683), mother of Ottoman Sultan Mehmed IV
- Hatice Muazzez Sultan (1629–1687), mother of Ottoman Sultan Ahmed II
- Khadijah of the Maldives, Sultana of the Maldives from 1347 to 1380
- Turhan Hatice Sultan, concubine of Ottoman Sultan Ibrahim I
- Hatice Muazzez, Polish Jewish wife of Ottoman Sultan Ibrahim I
- Khadija Gayibova, Azerbaijani pianist (1893–1938)
- Khadijah Farrakhan (1935–2026), wife of Louis Farrakhan

=== Living people ===
- Khadija Abbouda (born 1968), Moroccan athlete
- Khadija Ahrari, Afghan politician
- Khadija al-Salami (born 1966), Yemeni film producer
- Khadija Amin, Bangladesh Nationalist Party politician and Member of Parliament
- Khadija Arib (born 1960), Dutch politician
- Khadijah Hashim (born 1942), Malaysian journalist and teacher
- Khadija Adam Ismail, Kenyan model and 1984 Miss Kenya
- Khadija Ismayilova, Azerbaijani journalist
- Khadija Lalla, (born 2007) Moroccan princess
- Khadija Mumtaz (born 1955), Malayalam-language writer
- Khadija Mushtaq, Pakistani academic administrator and educator
- Khadija Qalanjo, Somali singer and dancer
- Khadija Salum Ally Al-Qassmy (born 1958), Tanzanian politician
- Khadija Shaw (born 1997), Jamaican footballer
- Khadeeja (actress) (died 2017), Malayalam-language film actress
- Khadijah Whittington (born 1986), American basketball player

=== Fictional people ===
- Khadijah James, character in the television series Living Single
- Khadija, played by Shweta Basu Prasad in the 2005 Indian film Iqbal

== Buildings ==
- Khadija Mosque

== Films ==
- Khadeeja, Malayalam-language film

== Places ==
- Lalla Khedidja, a mountain in the Djurdjura Range of Algeria (also known as Tamgut Aâlayen or Azeru Amghur in Taqbaylit)

== See also ==
- Khaji Da, a magical artifact or alien device from Blue Beetle comics
  - Khaji-Da, the device as depicted in Blue Beetle (film)
