= Hatice =

- Pronunciation: Turkish: [hatidʒe]
- Gender: Female

Origin
- Origin: Arabic
- Meaning: Early born baby girl
- Region of origin: Middle East

Other names
- Related names: Khadija, Khatija, Khatijah, Katijah, Khadeejah, Hatice, Tijah

Hatice (also Hadice, Hatçe) is an Arabic-origin Turkish feminine given name and Turkish variant of Khadija. It means trust worthy, highly respected and early born baby girl.

== People ==
Notable people with this name include:

=== Ottoman period ===
- Hatice Sultan (daughter of Selim I), an Ottoman princess, sister of Suleiman the Magnificent
- Hatice Sultan (daughter of Ahmed III), an 18th-century Ottoman princess, daughter of Sultan Ahmed III
- Hatice Sultan (daughter of Mustafa III), an Ottoman princess, daughter of Sultan Mustafa III and sister of Sultan Selim III
- Hatice Sultan (daughter of Murad V), an Ottoman princess, daughter of Sultan Murad V
- Hatice Sultan (daughter of Mehmed IV) (1660–1743), Ottoman princess
- Hatice Dürriaden Kadın (1860–1909), Ottoman consort of Mehmed V
- Hatice Halime Hatun (1410–1440), Turkish princess and wife of Sultan Murad II
- Hatice Muazzez Sultan (1629–1687), wife of Ottoman Sultan Ibrahim I
- Hatice Peyveste Hanım (1873–1943), consort of Sultan Abdulhamid II
- Mahfiruze Hatice, 17th-century Ottoman queen and wife of Sultan Ahmed I
- Hatice Nükhetsezâ Hanım (1827–1850), Ottoman consort of Sultan Abdulmecid I
- Hatice Şükriye Sultan (1906–1972), Ottoman princess
- Turhan Hatice (1627–1683), Ottoman queen and regent

=== Modern period ===
- Hatice Açıkalın (1909–2003), Turkish physician
- Hatice Akbaş (born 2002), Turkish boxer
- Hatice Altug (born 1978), Turkish physicist and professor
- Hatice Rumeysa Aredba (1873–1927), Abkhazian princess, Ottoman lady and memorialist
- Hatice Aslan (born 1962), Turkish actress
- Hatice Atay (born 1996), Turkish wheelchair basketball and para-badminton player
- Hatice Ozer Balli, Turkish economist
- Hatice Tuba Büyüküstün (born 1982), Turkish actress
- Hatice Beril Dedeoğlu (1961–2019), Turkish academic
- Hatice Demirel (born 1994), Turkish weightlifter
- Hatice Duman (born 1974), Turkish journalist
- Hatice Duman (born 1994), Turkish para table tennis player
- Hatice Gonnet-Bağana (born 1932), Turkish archaeologist
- Hatice Gokce Emir (born 2008), Turkish gymnast
- Hatice Nüzhet Gökdoğan (1910–2003), Turkish astronomer, mathematician and academic
- Hatice Guleryuz (born 1968), Turkish artist
- Hatice Sabiha Görkey (1888–1963), Turkish school teacher, politician and one of the first female Turkish parliament members
- Hatice Gunes, Turkish computer scientist
- Hatice Kumbaracı Gürsöz (born 1945), Turkish painter
- Hatice Kübra İlgün (born 1993), Turkish taekwondo practitioner
- Hatice Yıldız Levent (born 1958), Turkish classical singer
- Hatice Gizem Orge (born 1993), Turkish volleyball player
- Hatice Özgener (1865–1940), Turkish school teacher, politician and one of the first 18 female members of the parliament
- Hatice Bahar Özgüvenç (born 1984), Turkish footballer
- Hatice Dudu Özkal (born 1966), Turkish politician and theologian
- Hatice Özyurt (born 1987), Turkish-Dutch kickboxer
- Hatice Şendil (born 1983), Turkish actress and model
- Hatice Kübra Yangın (born 1989), Turkish taekwondo practitioner
- Hatice Duran Yildiz, Turkish physicist

== Places ==
- Hatice Sultan Palace, Istanbul waterside mansion
