= Fawzia Koofi =

Afghan politician and activist (born 1975)

- فَوزیَه کوفی
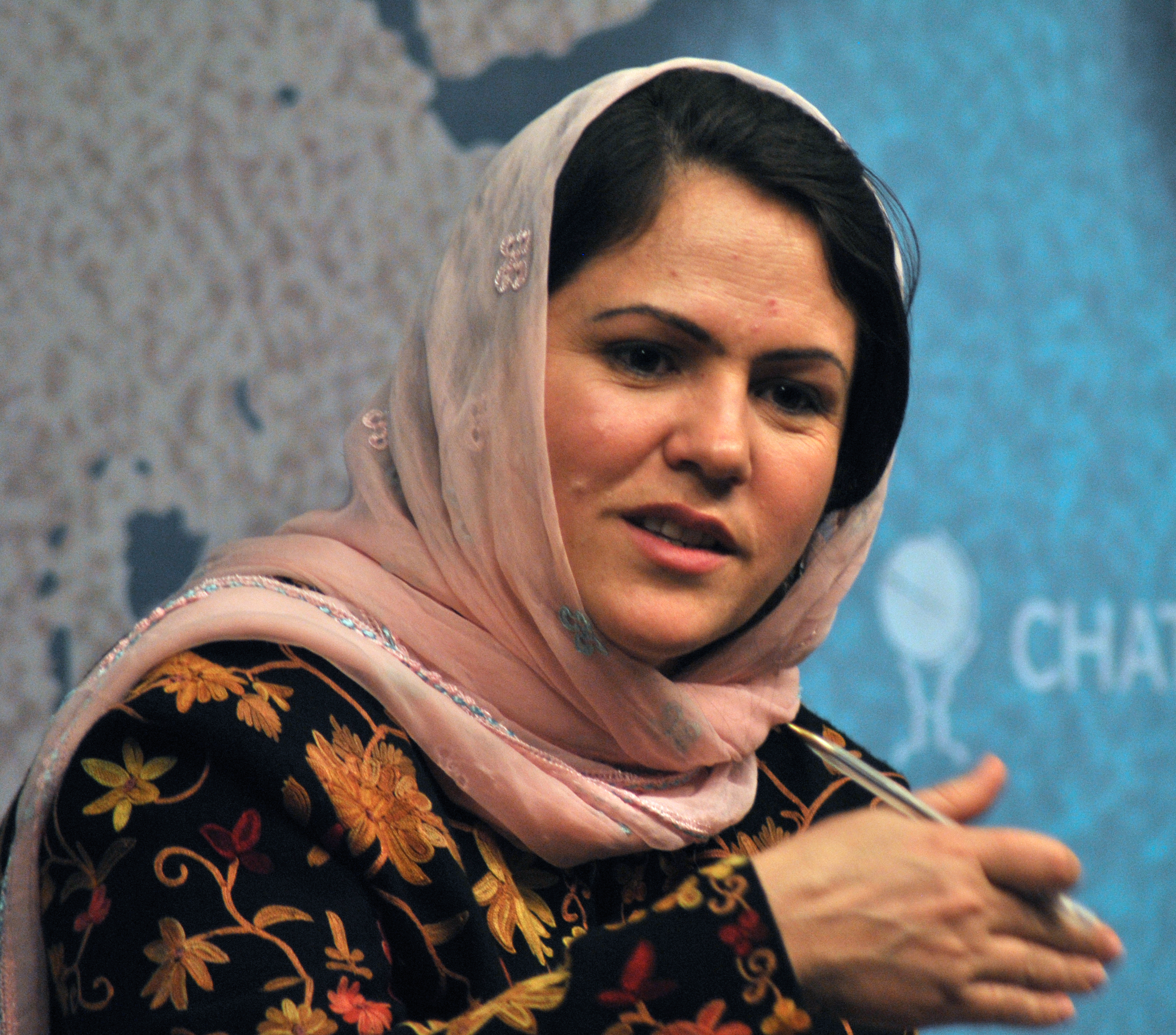
- Koofi speaking at Chatham House, 2012

Vice President of the National Assembly
- In office 2005 – 15 August 2021

Member of the Wolesi Jirga for Badakhshan
- In office 2005 – 15 August 2021

Personal details
- Born: Fawzia Koofi; 1975 (age 50–51) Badakhshan, Republic of Afghanistan
- Children: 2
- Education: Preston University
- Occupation: Politician, women's rights activist

Fawzia Koofi (Dari: فوزیه کوفی, Persian pronunciation: [fæwziːæ(h) kuːfiː]; born 1975) is an Afghan politician, writer, and women's rights activist. Originally from Badakhshan province and ethnically Tajik, Koofi was recently a member of the Afghan delegation negotiating peace with the Taliban in Doha Qatar. She is an ex Member of Parliament in Kabul and was the Vice President of the National Assembly.

== Biography ==
=== Youth and education ===
Koofi's father was a Member of Parliament (MP) for 25 years but died at the end of the Afghan war (1979–1989), killed by Mujahideen.

Born into a polygamous family of seven women, Koofi was first rejected by her parents because of her gender. Her father had married a younger woman and her mother sought to have a son to maintain her husband's affection. The day Koofi was born, she was left out to die in the sun.

Koofi managed to persuade her parents to send her to school, making her the only girl in the family to attend. She originally pursued a medical degree but was unable to continue when the Taliban banned women from all education after their 1996 takeover. After the 2001 fall of the Taliban she returned to school and eventually graduated from Preston university with a master's degree in business and management.

Koofi worked with vulnerable groups such as Internally Displaced People (IDP) and marginalized women and children, and served as a child protection officer for UNICEF from 2002 to 2004.

=== Political career ===
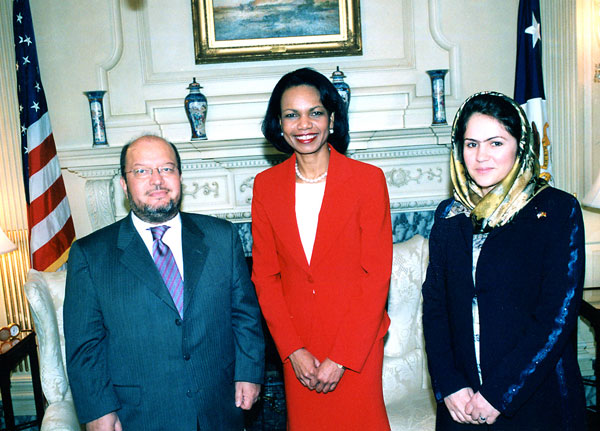
Then U.S. Secretary of State Condoleezza Rice with the speakers of the Afghan Parliament, Fawzia Koofi and Sayed Hamed Gailani in 2006.

Koofi began her political career in 2001 after the fall of the Taliban, promoting the right to education of girls in her "Back to school" campaign.

From 2001 to 2004, Fawzia Koofi worked with UNICEF as a Child Protection Officer to protect children from violence, exploitation and abuse.

In the parliamentary elections in 2005, she was elected to the Wolesi Jirga, the lower house of the Afghan National Assembly, for the Badakhshan district in the northeastern part of the country and served as the Deputy Speaker of the lower house whose president also carries the title of Vice President of the National Assembly. She was the first female Second Deputy Speaker of Parliament in the history of Afghanistan. She was re-elected in the parliamentary elections of 2010 and then elected MP from a total of 69 female members of the Assembly.

In Parliament, she has focused primarily on women's rights, but she also has legislated for the building of roads to connect remote villages to educational and health facilities. In 2009 Koofi drafted the Elimination of Violence Against Women (EVAW) legislation. Signed as a decree, the draft needed to be voted on in order to become an official document of the constitution. It was presented to Parliament in 2013 and was blocked by the conservative members who claimed articles of the law went against Islam. However, the law is being implemented in all 34 provinces in Afghanistan and court cases are being decided based on the law.

She has survived several assassination attempts, including one on 8 March 2010, near the town of Tora Bora.

Koofi intended to run for President of Afghanistan in the 2014 Afghan presidential election on a platform of equal rights for women, promoting universal education, and the opposition to political corruption, but she said in July 2014 that the election commission moved the registration date to October 2013 and as a result she did not qualify for the minimum age requirement of 40 years of age.

She was re-elected as a member of Parliament in 2014 but no longer serves as the deputy speaker. She currently serves as Chairperson of Afghanistan's Women, Civil Society and Human Rights Commission.

In 2020, Fawzia Koofi was a part of the 21-member team, which was supposed to represent the Afghanistan government in the negotiation peace talks with the Taliban. On 14 August 2020, she was shot in the arm by gunmen, who attempted to assassinate her near Kabul, while she was returning from a visit to the northern province of Parwan with her sister Maryam Koofi.

Amid the rapid advance of the Taliban during the summer of 2021, when asked in an interview about her thoughts regarding the U.S. troop withdrawal from Afghanistan, Fawzia Koofi said that the U.S. had abandoned the women of Afghanistan and that she's very disappointed with what's happening.

=== Women's rights engagement ===
Koofi has made it a priority to defend women's rights in Afghanistan. She has promoted education for women and children by advocating for access to good schools and creating opportunities for non-formal education for her constituents in Badakhshan province. While serving as Deputy Speaker in 2005, Koofi raised private funding to build girls schools in remote provinces. In 2009, she was selected as a Young Global Leader by the World Economic Forum. In 2020, she supported a change to Afghan law brought about by the #WhereIsMyName campaign led by Laleh Osmany to include women's names on Afghan identity cards, describing it as a "human right".

== Personal life ==
Koofi was married to a man named Hamid, an engineer and chemistry teacher. Her marriage was arranged, but she did not disapprove of her family's choice. Ten days after their wedding, Taliban soldiers arrested her husband and he was imprisoned. In prison he contracted tuberculosis and died shortly after his release in 2003. Following the Taliban takeover in August 2021, Fausia Kufi was placed under house arrest in Kabul. She left her homeland and has since been living in exile in London with her two daughters.

=== Autobiographical memoir ===
The Favored Daughter: One Woman's Fight to Lead Afghanistan into the Future, is an autobiographical memoir written by Fawzia Koofi with the aid of Nadene Ghouri. Originally published under the title Letters to My Daughter, this edition was published in 2012 by Palgrave Macmillan Publishers. The book tells the story of Koofi's life throughout her childhood, education, and involvement in politics. It consists of narrations about her life interspersed with letters written to her two daughters.

== Works ==
- Fawzia Koofi (April 2011). Letters to My Daughters. Canada: Douglas & Mcintyre. ISBN 978-1-55365-876-4.
- Fawzia Koofi (3 January 2012). The Favored Daughter: One Woman's Fight to Lead Afghanistan into the Future. USA: Palgrave Macmillan. ISBN 978-0-230-12067-9.

== In Media ==
- BBC HARDtalk 08 Jun 2022 Fawzia Koofi: Do Afghans still have hope?

== Recognition ==
She was recognized as one of the BBC's 100 women in 2013.

== See also ==
- Zarifa Ghafari
- Salima Mazari
