= Khadeeja =

Khadeeja may refer to:

- Khadeeja (film), a 1967 Indian Malayalam film
- Khadeeja (actress), Indian actress

== See also ==
- Khadija (disambiguation)
