= List of ambassadors of Turkey to Italy =

The list of ambassadors of Turkey to Italy provides a chronological record of individuals who have served as the diplomatic representatives of the Republic of Turkey to the Italian Republic.

== List of ambassadors ==
Ambassador	Term start	Term end	Ref.
Suad Davas	29 October 1923	30 April 1932	
Vasıf Çınar	28 May 1932	3 May 1934	
Zeki Nebil	3 May 1934	7 October 1934	
Hüseyin Ragıb Baydur	7 October 1934	16 August 1943	
Ruşen Eşref Ünaydın	27 August 1943	10 April 1944	
Cemal Hüsnü Taray	18 January 1945	12 October 1946	
Selim Rauf Sarper	12 October 1946	12 June 1947	
Feridun Cemal Erkin	19 July 1947	30 July 1948	
Hüseyin Ragıb Baydur	12 August 1948	27 March 1952	
Faik Zihni Akdur	20 October 1952	17 September 1954	
Mehmet Cevad Açıkalın	11 October 1954	4 December 1961	
Bedii Karaburçak	5 December 1961	2 September 1962	
Fuat Bayramoğlu	3 September 1962	28 March 1963	
Namık Kemal Yolga	31 March 1963	30 June 1965	
Adnan Kural	5 July 1965	1 January 1967	
Fuat Bayramoğlu	4 January 1967	5 September 1969	
Turan Tuluy	15 September 1969	24 July 1970	
İsmail Erez	19 November 1970	17 April 1972	
Pertev Subaşı	23 July 1972	22 September 1976	
Semih Akbil	4 October 1976	18 July 1978	
Ali Binkaya	19 August 1978	28 November 1980	
Hamit Batu	15 December 1980	18 February 1984	
Hasan Fahir Alaçam	1 May 1984	23 January 1987	
Necdet Tezel	23 January 1987	17 September 1991	
Ömer Erşan Akbel	22 November 1991	1 June 1995	
Ünal Ünsal	31 May 1995	30 September 1996	
Umut Arık	1 October 1996	31 March 1998	
İnal Batu	31 March 1998	11 January 1999	
Mehmet Necati Utkan	4 February 1999	27 November 2004	
Sıtkı Uğur Ziyal	28 November 2004	20 August 2009	
Ali Yakıtal	1 October 2009	1 March 2010	
Hakkı Akil	20 January 2011	12 April 2014	
Adnan Aydın Sezgin	23 September 2014	31 October 2016	
Murat Salim Esenli	2 November 2016	30 April 2021	
Ömer Gücük	14 June 2021	Present	

== List of Ottoman ambassadors ==
Ambassador	Term start	Term end
Rüstem Paşa	1 January 1861	1 January 1870
Yanko Fotiadis Paşa	1 January 1870	1 January 1872
Serkis Efendi	1 January 1872	1 January 1874
Aleksandr Karatodori Paşa	1 January 1874	1 January 1876
Mahmud Esad Paşa	1 January 1876	1 January 1877
Turhan Paşa	1 January 1877	1 January 1881
İstefanaki Musurus Paşa	1 January 1881	1 January 1886
Yanko Fotiadis Paşa	1 January 1886	1 January 1889
Yusuf Ziya Paşa	1 January 1889	1 January 1890
Mahmud Nedim Paşa	1 January 1890	1 January 1896
Mustafa Reşid Paşa	12 March 1896	25 August 1908
Ziya Paşa	30 August 1908	30 August 1909
İbrahim Hakkı Paşa	1 January 1909	24 January 1910
Hüseyin Kazım Bey	30 January 1910	20 October 1912
Mehmed Nabi Bey	25 October 1912	10 August 1915
Cami Baykurt	4 September 1920	10 January 1922
Osman Nizami Paşa	20 August 1921	30 August 1922
Celaleddin Arif Bey	1 January 1922	1 January 1923
Hilmi Bey	27 June 1923	28 August 1923
Suad Davas	28 August 1923	29 October 1923
