= Chahar Kent =

Chahar Kent چارکنت
- Village
- Location in Afghanistan
- Coordinates: 36°30′0″N 67°20′0″E
- Country: Afghanistan
- Province: Balkh Province
- District: Chahar Kint District
- Time zone: + 4.30

Chahar Kent is a village in Balkh Province in northern Afghanistan.

== See also ==
- Chahar Kint District
- Balkh Province
