= Zarifa Ghafari =

Afghan mayor and entrepreneur

- ظریفه غفاري
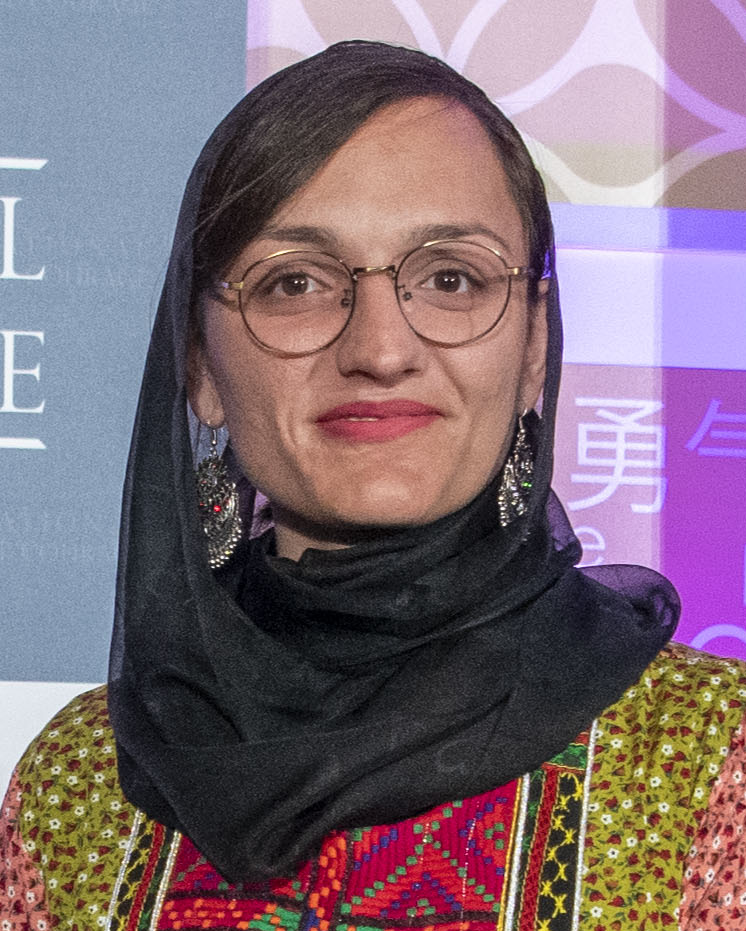
- Zarifa Ghafari in 2020

Mayor of Maidan Shahr
- In office July 2018 – August 2021

Personal details
- Born: 25.09.1994 Kabul, Afghanistan
- Spouse: Bashir Mohammadi
- Education: Punjab University, Cornell University
- Occupation: Politician, mayor, economist, women's rights activist, author, entrepreneur
- Known for: Afghan politician, economist, and women's rights activist, best known for becoming one of Afghanistan's youngest female mayors and for her advocacy for women's rights, education, democracy, and resistance to Taliban oppression.
- Awards: BBC 100 Women (2019); Asia’s Outstanding Women Leadership Award (2019); International Women of Courage Award (2020); One Young World Politician of the Year Award (2020); Rumi Award (2020); InStyle Badass 50 (2020); North-South Prize of the Council of Europe (2020, listed in a previous CV version); TIME Next Generation Leaders (2021); OXI Courage Award (2021); Forbes 30/50 Change-Maker Award (2022); UN Women Rights Award (2022, listed in previous CV materials); Human Rights Award, HAWAR-Help Organization, Berlin. Previous CV materials report Nobel Peace Prize nominations by Swiss parliamentarians in 2023 and 2024, Laureate of the Laura Chinchilla Prize for Civic Participation 2026.

Zarifa Ghafari (Pashto: ظریفه غفاري, Pashto pronunciation: [zəriːfɑː ɣəfɑːriː]; born 1994) is a former female mayor of Maidan Shahr, capital city of the Wardak Province, Afghanistan. Ghafari was one of the few Afghan female mayors, next to the first Afghanistan's mayor, Azra Jafari and Khadija Zahra Ahmadi, and was also the youngest to be appointed, at the age of 24. She is known for her efforts to advance women's rights in Afghanistan. Ghafari was chosen as an International Woman of Courage in 2020 by the US Secretary of State. She has survived three assassination attempts.

== Life and career ==
Early life and education

Zarifa Ghafari was born in 1994 in Kabul, Afghanistan, and originates from the village of Dawran Khel in the Chak district of Maidan Wardak province. She was the eldest of eight children of Abdul Wasi Ghafari, an Afghan Army colonel and commander in the Special Operations Corps.

During the Taliban’s first period in power (1996–2001), Ghafari’s access to education was restricted, and she attended school clandestinely. Following the fall of the Taliban government in 2001, girls’ education resumed in Afghanistan. However, she later continued her education in secret when her father was assigned to Paktia province. Her parents initially opposed her attending school because of security concerns, including a suicide attack targeting a school. Ghafari was subsequently hospitalised after being caught in the blast of a bombing that killed the provincial governor.[1]

Ghafari completed her secondary education at Halima Kazan High School in Paktia province.

Her father was killed by militants outside his home in Kabul on 5 November 2020.[2][3][4]

Ghafari pursued higher education in India on a scholarship, attending Panjab University in Chandigarh, where she obtained bachelor’s and master’s degrees in economics. In 2026, she graduated from Cornell University in the United States with a Master of Public Administration (MPA), specialising in Government, Politics and Policy Studies, with a minor in Peace Studies.

Mayor of Maidan Shahr

Ghafari applied for the position of mayor of Maidan Shahr and was selected ahead of other candidates, most of whom were men, following a competitive assessment process.[1] She was officially appointed mayor in July 2018 by President Ashraf Ghani.[5] At the age of 24, she became one of Afghanistan’s youngest mayors and one of the few women to hold such a position in a traditionally conservative province.

Her appointment was met with protests and opposition from local politicians, who challenged her appointment on the grounds of her age and gender. As a result, her assumption of office was delayed by approximately nine months.[7]

Although Ghafari has sometimes been described as Afghanistan’s first female mayor, other women had previously held mayoral positions in different parts of the country.[6] Her appointment was particularly significant because Maidan Wardak was considered one of Afghanistan’s more socially conservative provinces, where the Taliban maintained considerable influence.[2]

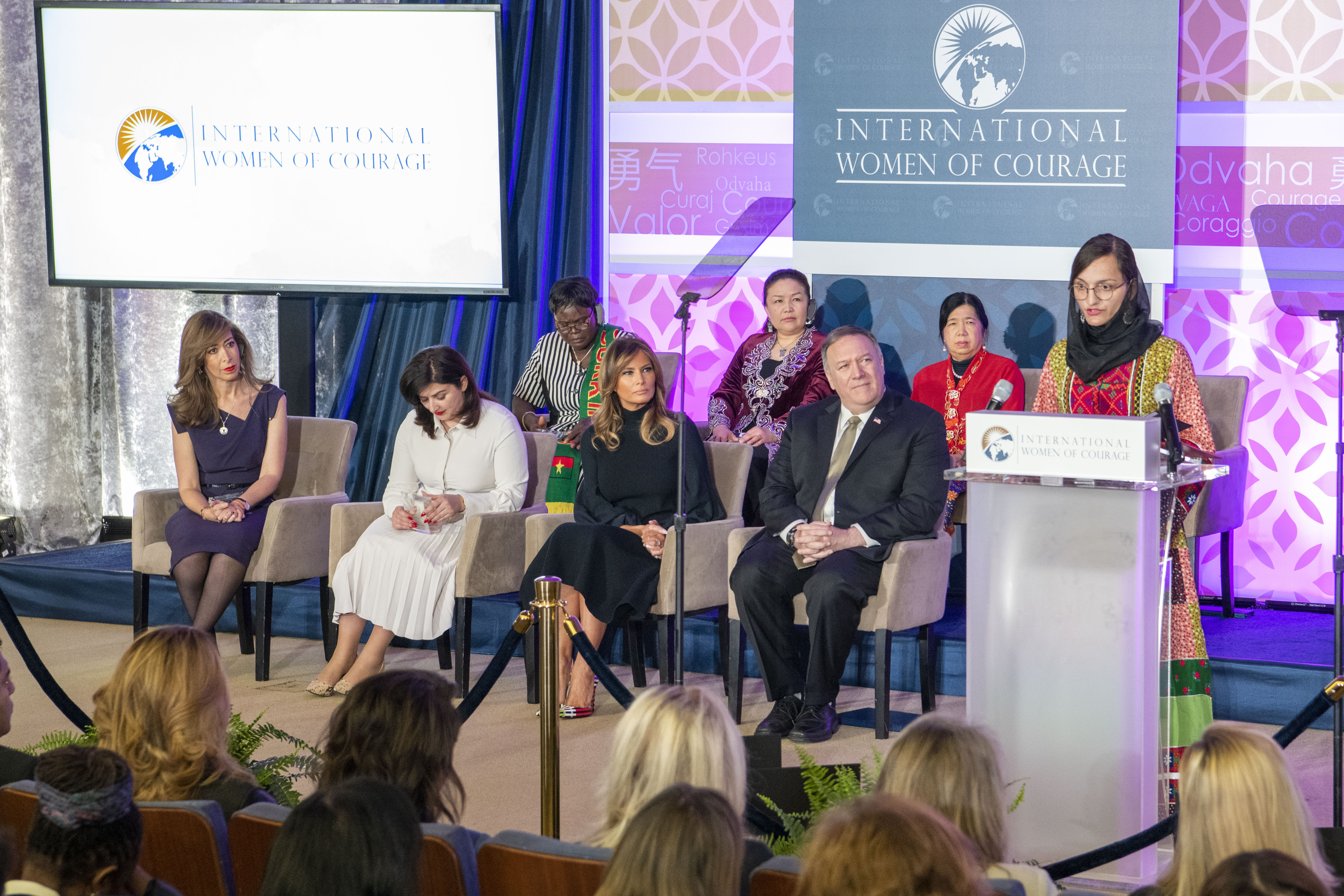
Ghafari speaking at the 2020 International Women of Courage Awards ceremony

=== Fall of the Islamic Republic ===
In 2021, Joe Biden ordered the complete withdrawal of all US Forces from Afghanistan. Ghafari notes that the Americans had destroyed whole villages in her country to remove a few Taliban, but with this deal she said they "sold my country".

In August 2021, with the Taliban advancing, Ghafari announced she wouldn't flee the country. On August 15, 2021, after the fall of Kabul to the Taliban, she said, "I'm sitting here waiting for them to come. There is no one to help me or my family. I'm just sitting with them and my husband. And they will come for people like me and kill me." Following the takeover of Afghanistan's government by the Taliban in mid-August 2021, she fled the country arriving in Istanbul, Turkey on Wednesday, August 18, along with her partner, Bashir Mohammadi, her mother and four brothers and three sisters. She stayed in Bonn or Düsseldorf for six months before she decided to leave Germany and return to her home country. She discussed this with her fiancée, with the authorities in Kabul, a Netflix film crew and her biographer and then she returned relying on her profile to keep her safe. Her first post on social media was a photo of her at her father's grave. She was only there for days but although she noticed the improvements in security she also saw that women rights were dramatically reduced and they were banned from public places like parks and fun fairs.

In December 2024, Ghafari enrolled in a Master's program at Cornell University.

== In the media ==
The New York Times – International profile of Ghafari’s political leadership and security challenges (2019).

TIME Magazine – Featured as a 2021 TIME Next Generation Leader.

The Washington Post – Interview following the International Women of Courage Award ceremony (2020).

ABC News – Interview on protecting women’s rights in Taliban peace negotiations (2020).

Der Spiegel – International interview on political leadership and threats (2020).

United Nations Geneva – Keynote engagement at the Geneva Peace Talks (2021).

Euronews – Interview on Afghanistan’s political future and women’s rights (2021).

European Parliament – Engagement on Afghan women’s rights and the Sakharov Prize finalists (2022).

Chatham House – Published interview on her political career and experiences as mayor (2022).

Netflix – Featured in the internationally distributed documentary In Her Hands (2022).

Cornell University – Featured in Cornell Chronicle discussing women’s rights and advocacy (2024).

== Awards ==
Zarifa Ghafari has received several international awards and recognitions for her political leadership, courage and advocacy for women's rights, including the BBC 100 Women recognition (2019), Asia's Outstanding Women Leadership Award (2019), the U.S. International Women of Courage Award (2020), One Young World Politician of the Year Award (2020), Rumi Award (2020), InStyle Badass 50 recognition (2020), OXI Courage Award (2021), TIME Next Generation Leaders recognition (2021), the Council of Europe's North-South Prize (2021), Forbes 30/50 Change-Maker recognition (2022), the International Women's Rights Award from the Geneva Summit for Human Rights and Democracy (2022), and the Laura Chinchilla Prize for Civic Participation (2026). She was also nominated for the 2023–2024 Nobel Peace Prize by Swiss parliamentarians.

== See also ==
- Maryam Durani
- Fawzia Koofi
- Salima Mazari
- Azra Jafari
