= Shi'b Abi Talib =

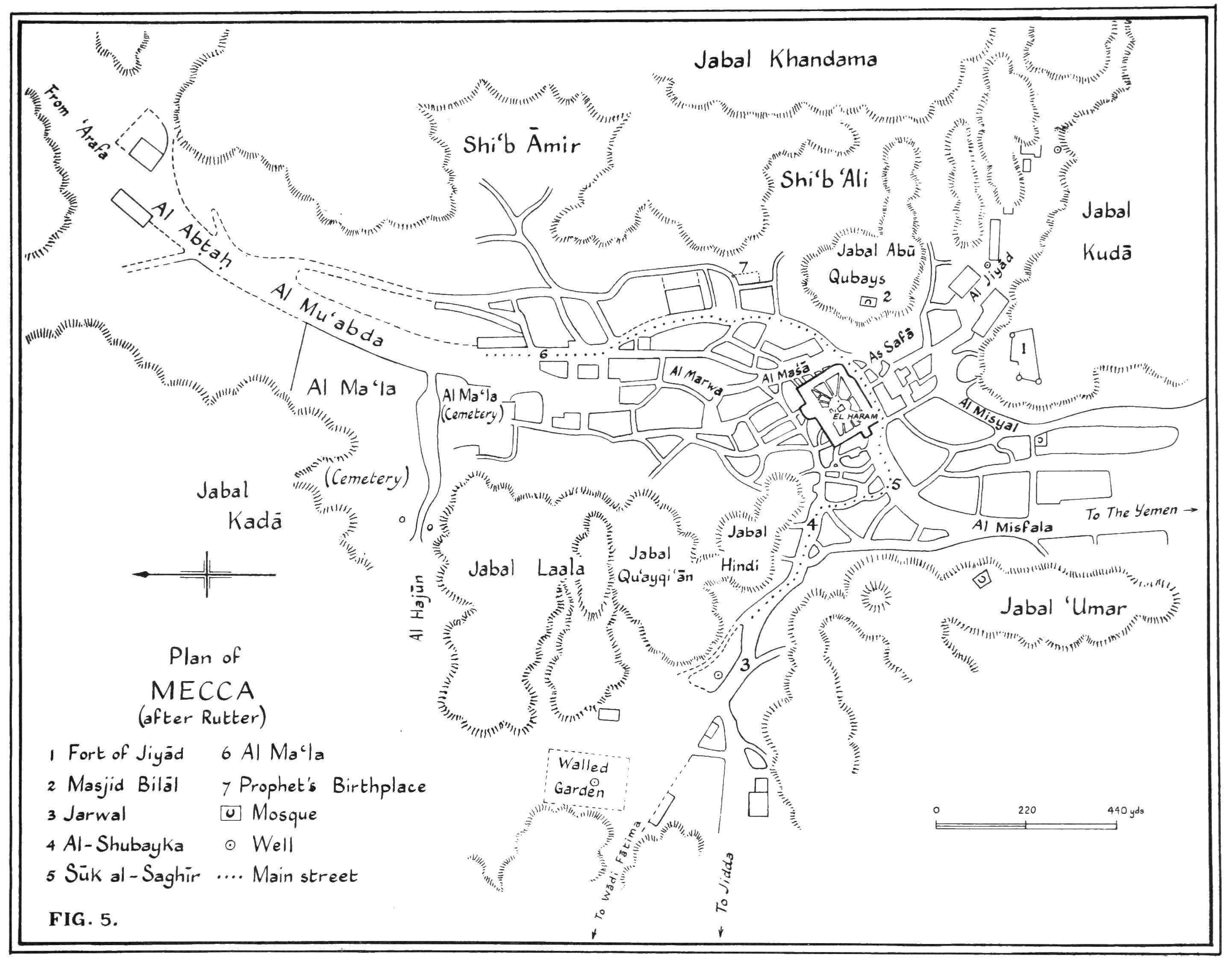
Plan of Mecca showing Shiʿb ʿAlī (later known as Shiʿb Abī Ṭālib), the valley traditionally associated with the Hashemite boycott.

Shib Abi Talib (Arabic: شِعْب أَبِي طَالِب) was a valley in Mecca where Muhammad, the Prophet of Islam, and the two clans of Banu Hashim and Banu al-Muttalib took refuge during the Quraysh boycott. The boycott was imposed because of the Quraysh's opposition to Muhammad's message and their support for Banu Hashim. It included restrictions on trade and social relations with these two clans and lasted for about two to three years. During this period, the people living in Shib Abi Talib faced difficult conditions because of shortages of food and other basic needs. The boycott finally ended after about three years, and Banu Hashim left Shib Abi Talib.

== Location and name ==
Shib Abi Talib was a valley in Mecca, near the Kaaba. In Arabic, the word "shi'b" means a valley or a passage between two mountains. According to geographical sources, this valley was located between the mountains of Abu Qubays and Khundama, and it was linked to Banu Hashim. This place was also known by other names, such as "Shib Banu Hashim," "Shib Abi Talib," "Shib Ali ibn Abi Talib," and "Shib Abu Yusuf."

== The Quraysh boycott ==
After the Quraysh failed to stop the spread of Islam, the leaders of the tribe decided to put pressure on Banu Hashim because they supported the Prophet of Islam. After meeting at Dar al-Nadwa, they made an agreement to boycott Banu Hashim and Banu al-Muttalib. According to this agreement, buying and selling with them and marriage with members of these two families were forbidden. They also decided that the boycott would continue until they handed Muhammad over. The purpose of this boycott was to isolate Banu Hashim because they supported the Prophet of Islam. However, because of family ties between some members of Quraysh and Banu Hashim, these restrictions were not always fully followed.

Al-Tabari reported that Quraysh wrote the terms of this agreement in a document and placed it inside the Kaaba. This document was written by Mansur ibn Ikrima al-Abdari, and according to it, trade and social relations with Banu Hashim and Banu al-Muttalib were stopped. On the first night of Muharram in the seventh year after the beginning of Muhammad's mission, Banu Hashim, along with Abu Talib, went to Shib Abi Talib, and Banu al-Muttalib joined them. Abu Lahab, however, supported Quraysh's decision to boycott Banu Hashim and did not join them. They stayed in Shib for two or three years. During this time, Quraysh tried to stop food from reaching them by limiting their access to markets and preventing the purchase of supplies. However, according to Al-Tabari's report, some people from Quraysh secretly brought food to them. Al-Baladhuri also reported that, according to some accounts, the boycott document was not placed in the Kaaba and was kept by people such as Tuayma ibn Adi or Umm Abi Jahl (Asma bint Makhrāma).

== Living Conditions During the Boycott ==
During the boycott, the Banu Hashim faced very difficult conditions because they had limited access to food and other basic needs. They were unable to get supplies, and they could only leave Shi'b Abi Talib during the Hajj season. The hardships became so severe that the sound of children crying could be heard from outside the valley. During this time, some members of Quraysh supported this situation, while others were unhappy with the suffering of the Banu Hashim. Throughout the boycott, some members of Quraysh secretly brought food and supplies to their relatives among the Banu Hashim.

Al-Baladhuri, quoting Abdullah ibn Abbas, wrote that the Banu Hashim remained under siege in Shi'b Abi Talib for three years, and Quraysh blocked the arrival of supplies to them; as a result of the severe hardship, some of them lost their lives. Hakim ibn Hizam ibn Khuwaylid, the nephew of Khadijah, would bring the wheat that was being brought from Syria to near the Shi'b and would guide the camels toward it so that Banu Hashim could take the wheat. Also, a group of Quraysh, led by Hisham ibn Amr, tried to break the boycott agreement and in this way they were joined by Zuhayr ibn Abi Umayyah, Mut'im ibn Adi, Abu al-Bakhtari ibn Hisham, Zam'ah ibn al-Aswad, and Sahl ibn Bayda.

== End of the boycott ==
In the tenth year of prophethood, God revealed to Muhammad that termites had eaten the written boycott agreement and that nothing remained of it except the phrase “Bismika Allahumma.” Muhammad then informed Abu Talib of this matter. Abu Talib went with a group of Banu Hashim to Quraysh and asked them to bring the Sahifa. After examining it, Quraysh found that termites had eaten the writing and that only the phrase “Bismika Allahumma” remained on it; as a result, the boycott ended and Banu Hashim left the Shi‘b Abi Talib.

== See also ==
- Banu Hashim
- Abu Talib ibn Abd al-Muttalib
- Khadijah
- Muhammad in Mecca
- Persecution of Muslims by Meccans
