= Mustapha Farrakhan Jr. =

American basketball player (born 1988)

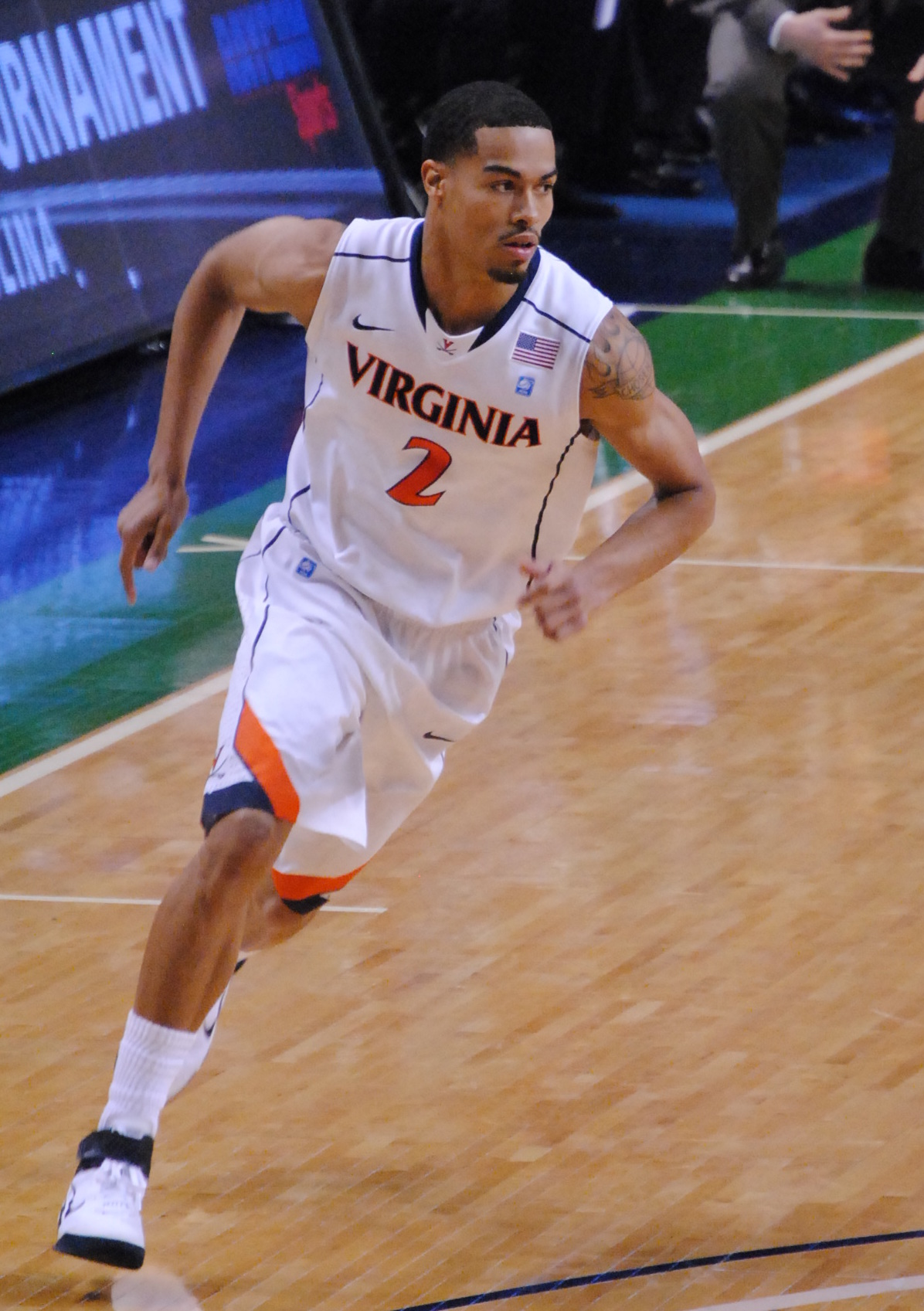
- Farrakhan playing for Virginia in 2011

Personal information
- Born: November 2, 1988 (age 38) Harvey, Illinois, U.S.
- Listed height: 6 ft 4 in (1.93 m)
- Listed weight: 180 lb (82 kg)

Career information
- High school: Thornton Township (Harvey, Illinois)
- College: Virginia (2007–2011)
- NBA draft: 2011: undrafted
- Playing career: 2011–2016
- Position: Shooting guard / point guard

Career history
- 2011–2012: Bakersfield Jam
- 2012–2013: Iowa Energy
- 2013: Sioux Falls Skyforce
- 2013: Idaho Stampede
- 2013–2014: Melbourne Tigers
- 2015–2016: Oklahoma City Blue
- Stats at Basketball Reference

Mustapha Farrakhan Jr. (born November 2, 1988) is an American professional basketball player. He played college basketball for the University of Virginia. Farrakhan has also played in the NBA Summer League, the NBA G League, and the Australian National Basketball League.

== Early life ==
Farrakhan is the grandson of Nation of Islam leader Louis Farrakhan and Khadijah Farrakhan. His father, Mustapha Farrakhan Sr., is the Supreme Captain of the Nation of Islam.

Farrakhan was born in Harvey, Illinois, and attended Thornton Township High School. Farrakhan majored in sociology at the University of Virginia. As of 2011, he was a practicing member of the Nation of Islam.

== College career ==
Farrakhan played four years of college basketball at the University of Virginia. In his final year of college, he averaged 13.5 points, 2.8 rebounds and 1.8 assists in 31 games played.

== Professional career ==
=== 2011–2012 season ===
Farrakhan went undrafted in the 2011 NBA draft. On November 3, 2011, Farrakhan was selected by the Bakersfield Jam in the first round of the 2011 NBA Development League Draft.

=== 2012–2013 season ===
In July 2012, Farrakhan joined the New York Knicks for the 2012 NBA Summer League. In 5 games, he averaged 9.6 points, 1.8 assists and 1.6 rebounds per game. On October 1, 2012, he signed with the Milwaukee Bucks. However, he was later waived by the Bucks on October 27, 2012.

On November 1, 2012, Farrakhan was re-acquired by the Bakersfield Jam. On November 5, 2012, he was traded to the Iowa Energy. On January 28, 2013, he was waived by the Energy. On January 31, 2013, he was acquired by the Sioux Falls Skyforce. On February 25, 2013, he was traded to the Idaho Stampede. On March 13, 2013, he was waived by the Stampede after just 6 games. He was then acquired by the Tulsa 66ers on March 15 but then waived on March 20 before appearing in a game for them.

=== 2013–2014 season ===
On September 30, 2013, Farrakhan signed with the Los Angeles Clippers. However, he was later waived by the Clippers on October 8, 2013. On November 18, he signed with the Melbourne Tigers for the rest of the 2013–14 NBL season.

=== 2015–2016 season ===
On October 22, 2015, Farrakhan signed with the Oklahoma City Thunder, but was waived just two days later. On November 3, he was acquired by the Oklahoma City Blue as an affiliate player from the Thunder. On November 14, he made his debut with the OKC Blue in a 110–104 loss to the Austin Spurs, recording 18 points, one rebound, one assist and two steals in 22 minutes. On February 27, he was waived by the Blue. On April 1, he was acquired by the Fort Wayne Mad Ants.

=== 2019 ===
In July 2019 he was signed by the Ball Hogs of the Big3.
