= Salima Mazari =

Afghan politician

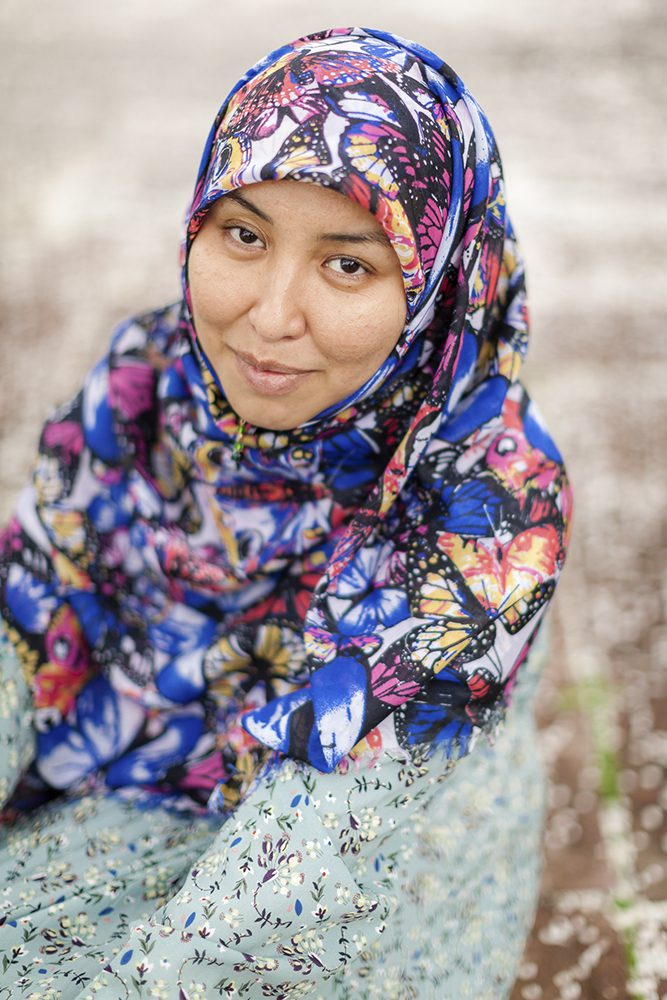

District Governor of Charkint District in Balkh province
- In office 2018 – 20 August 2021
- Constituency: Charkint District

Personal details
- Born: 1980 (age 45–46)

Salima Mazari (Dari: سلیمه مزاری; born 1980) is an Afghan politician, who served as the District Governor of Charkint District in Balkh province in Afghanistan and one of the three women district governors in Afghanistan.

== Biography ==
Mazari was born in Iran in 1980, a refugee as her family had escaped the Soviet invasion of Afghanistan. She grew up in Iran, earning a degree from the University of Tehran and working for the International Organization for Migration, before returning to Afghanistan. In 2018, she was named District Governor of Charkint District in Balkh province. As governor, she formed a security commission to recruit local militias into the fight against the Taliban. In 2020, she negotiated the surrender of over 100 Taliban soldiers in her province.

Amid the 2021 Taliban offensive, she refused to flee as several other governors in the country did, with her district putting up significant resistance to the Taliban. Until the complete collapse of the Islamic Republic of Afghanistan following the Fall of Kabul, hers was one of the few districts in the country to remain unoccupied by the Taliban. In mid-August, news reports expressed concern that she had been captured by the Taliban. According to subsequent reports, Mazari was at the provincial Governor's office when news of the surrender of Balkh and fall of Mazar-i-Sharif reached her. With this news, she chose to leave the district, and escaped to an undisclosed location in the United States with the help of 2021 U.S. evacuation from Afghanistan.

She was recognized as one of the BBC's 100 Women of 2021.

== See also ==
- Zarifa Ghafari
