= Khadija Umar =

Pakistani politician

Member of the Provincial Assembly of the Punjab
- In office 2002 – 14 January 2023
- Constituency: Reserved seat for women

Personal details
- Born: 29 August 1975 (age 51) Rawalpindi, Punjab, Pakistan
- Party: PTI (2023-present)
- Other political affiliations: PML(Q) (2002-2023)

Khadija Umar (Urdu: خدیجہ عمر; born 29 August 1975) is a Pakistani politician who was a member of Provincial Assembly of the Punjab from 2002 to 2023.

== Early life and education ==
She was born on 29 August 1975 in Rawalpindi.

She graduated in 1998 from Marghzar College, Gujrat and has the degree of Bachelor of Arts. She obtained a Diploma in Interior Designing from the National College of Arts in 2000.

== Political career ==
She was elected to the Provincial Assembly of the Punjab as a candidate of Pakistan Muslim League (Q) (PML-Q) on a reserved seat for women in the 2002 Pakistani general election. She was the youngest female MPA.

She was re-elected to the Provincial Assembly of the Punjab as a candidate of PML-Q on a reserved seat for women in the 2008 Pakistani general election.

She was re-elected to the Provincial Assembly of the Punjab as a candidate of PML-Q on a reserved seat for women in 2014.

She was re-elected to the Provincial Assembly of the Punjab as a candidate of PML-Q on a reserved seat for women in the 2018 Pakistani general election.

On 21 February 2023, after the dissolution of the Provincial Assembly, she, along with former Chief Minister Chaudhry Pervaiz Elahi and eight other former PML(Q) MPAs, joined the Pakistan Tehreek-e-Insaf (PTI).
