= Hatice Kumbaracı Gürsöz =

Turkish painter (born 1945)

Hatice Kumbaraci Gürsöz
- Born: 1945 (age 80–81); Adana, Turkey
- Education: Istanbul State Fine Arts Academy
- Known for: Painting
- Website: www.haticekumbaracigursoz.com

Hatice Kumbaraci Gürsöz (born 1945) is a Turkish painter.

== Early life and education ==
Hatice Kumbaraci was born in Adana, Turkey. After finishing her primary and secondary education, she attended Istanbul State Fine Arts Academy in 1964. She was taught by Dinçer Erimez, and worked in the Studio of Neşet Günal. In 1969, she graduated from the Higher Painting Department. After graduation, she was further educated in the field of ceramics by working in the Studio of Sadi Diren for two years.

== Career ==
Already in the primary school, she received her first award in the field of drawing. After she graduated, she taught Painting and Art History for six years in Istanbul, Adana and Ankara. She lived for significant periods in the countries of Australia, Pakistan, Germany, Greece, Turkmenistan and especially in Italy, France, Switzerland, Syria and Jordan, which she studied the painting arts of. In Germany, she earned membership of the Federal Union of Artists (BBK).

=== Awards ===
In 1997, she was awarded the Abdi İpekçi Friendship and Peace Prize for her works in Greece. In an exhibition that she had in Turkmenistan, one work of art was done in collaboration with Turkmen artists, which earned her the Turkmen Friendship Award in 2003. Due to her organizing the Armada Art Festival, she received the Armada Art Award in 2004. In 2009, she received the MSU-DGSA Graduates Societies "40 Years Success in Art Award". In 2016, she received a "thank-you plaque" for her long-lasting efforts for the field of art.

== Works ==
She has many works, which are part of several private and public collections. She has a connection with Henri Rousseau.

== Exhibitions ==
She has held 40 personal exhibits in Turkey, Australia, Pakistan, Germany, Greece, Turkmenistan, Syria, Jordan and Switzerland and participated in over 150 collaborative exhibitions. Exhibitions titled "Bridges" of her in collaboration with the Greek painter Sophia Kalogeropoulou held in 2009 in Izmir and Ankara, featuring artwork of mutual culture from both sides of the Aegean Sea, were devoted to the good relations between the two countries.

=== Personal exhibitions ===
- 2016 “Sınırsız Sevgi“, Galeri Çankaya, Ankara,
- 2009 “Köprüler”, State Art and Sculpture Museum, Ankara (In collaboration with Sofia Kalegeropulos),
- 2009 “Köprüler”, State Art and Sculpture Museum, İzmir (In collaboration with Sofia Kalegeropulos),
- 1969 Taksim Art Gallery, İstanbul
