= Khadija Besikri =

Libyan writer

- Born: January 12, 1962 (age 64); Benghazi, Libyya
- Occupations: Human rights activist and poet
- Writing career
- Genre: Poetry

Khadija Besikri (خديجة بسيكري) (born January 12, 1962 Benghazi, Libya) is a Libyan poet, writer, and human rights activist.

== Biography ==
Besikri started a campaign in 2017 when she submitted her proposal to promote reading among young people within Benghazi and its environs to the Benghazi Cultural Office. Her program targets youth between the ages of 4 and 18. Besikri also participated in the Short Story Lab event in Benghazi, which featured poems whose themes related to the civil war in Libya.

Besikri founded the National Organisation of the Women of the Amazon, a non-profit and non-governmental organization concerned with women's rights. It has embarked on many charitable activities, and collected donations on behalf of the revolutionaries during the civil war of 2011. Her organisation has also helped rehabilitate displaced families. In March 2016, she visited the Benghazi Medical Center, and called on the interim government and civil society organizations to help provide medical facilities in Benghazi and expedite the provision of medical services to help treat the wounded and the sick.
