= Hatice Açıkalın =

Turkish physician (1909-2003)

Dr. Hatice Açıkalın
- Born: 1909; Ottoman Empire
- Died: May 13, 2003 (aged 93–94)
- Education: University of Paris
- Scientific career
- Fields: Internal medicine, cardiology

Hatice Açıkalın (1909 – May 13, 2003) was a Turkish female physician specialized in cardiology.

She was born in 1909. She was the sister of Cevat Açıkalın, an ambassador and one of the close associates of Mustafa Kemal Atatürk (1881-1938).

She worked with hematologist Jean Pierre Soulier (1915–2003) at the University of Paris, and achieved her specialization in Internal medicine shortly before World War II. During the 1950s and 1960, she served as an internist at Cerrahpaşa Hospital in Istanbul. From 1974 until her retirement, she was the head of Internal medicine Clinic at Haseki Hospital.

In 1963, she was among the 27 founders of Turkish Society of Cardiology (Turkish: Türk Kardiyoloji Derneği) (TKD). She served as vice chairperson in the first two terms of the executive board.

It was rare that an article by a Turkish physician should be published in an international high-level scientific journal before World War II and the 10–15 years following. In 1939, Acikalin published an article with two French colleagues in the Bulletin de l'Académie de Médecine. Another international publication was in“La Presse Médicale in 1952. Açıkalin represented the TKD at the Congress of Cardiology, which is held annually in Paris, France, every May. Being fluent in French, she took part at the congress continuously until the age of 80.

Hatice Acikalın had a brief marriage. She died at the age of 94 on May 13, 2003.
