= Khadija Zahra Ahmadi =

Afghan politician now living in exile

Mayor of Nili
- In office 2018–2021

Khadija Zahra Ahmadi (Persian: خدیجه زهرا احمدی) is an Afghan politician who was mayor of the city of Nili, in Daykunidi province, in central Afghanistan, from 2018 to 2021, until the fall of Afghanistan to the Taliban.

Zahra grew up in Iran in a refugee family who fled Afghanistan after the Soviet invasion. She is the second Afghan female mayor belonging to the Hazara ethnic group after Azra Jafari. Zarifa Ghafari, a Pashtun native, is the third Afghan women to be a mayor in the post-Taliban era.

During the time Ahmadi was a mayor, she received death threats from fundamentalist and Islamist groups like the Taliban. Like many other Afghans, she was forced to leave the country after the fall of Kabul in 2021 and later resettled in Spain. On April 25, 2022, she was awarded with the "Reconocimiento Mare Terra" prize for her fight and advocacy for Afghan women's rights.
