= Khadija Abeba =

Djiboutian lawyer (head of the Supreme Court)

- Born: Djibouti
- Occupation: Judge
- Known for: President of the Supreme Court of Djibouti

Khadija Abeba is the President of the Supreme Court of Djibouti and is the country's highest-ranking female official.

== Career ==
Abeba was appointed as President of the Supreme Court of Djibouti in 1996. In the event of President Ismaël Omar Guelleh's illness or death, Abeba would become head of state. Human rights in Djibouti is a major concern of Abeba's and she has organised workshops with the Djiboutian League for Human Rights (LDDH) to explore solutions to issues facing the country.

Khadija Abeba also became the first female judge in 1977, and in 1996 became the first woman in Djibouti to be President of the Court of Appeal. She was followed into the Djiboutian judicial system by judges Chantal Clément, Fozia Hassan Bahdon and Naïba Djama. Abeba is known as a progressive legislator in Djibouti. Whilst women have the right to vote in Djibouti their political representation is still limited. In 2003 Hawa Ahmed Youssouf was appointed to role of Secretary of State for the Promotion of Women and Family and Social Affairs.
