= Khadija El Bidaouia =

Moroccan singer (1953–2022)

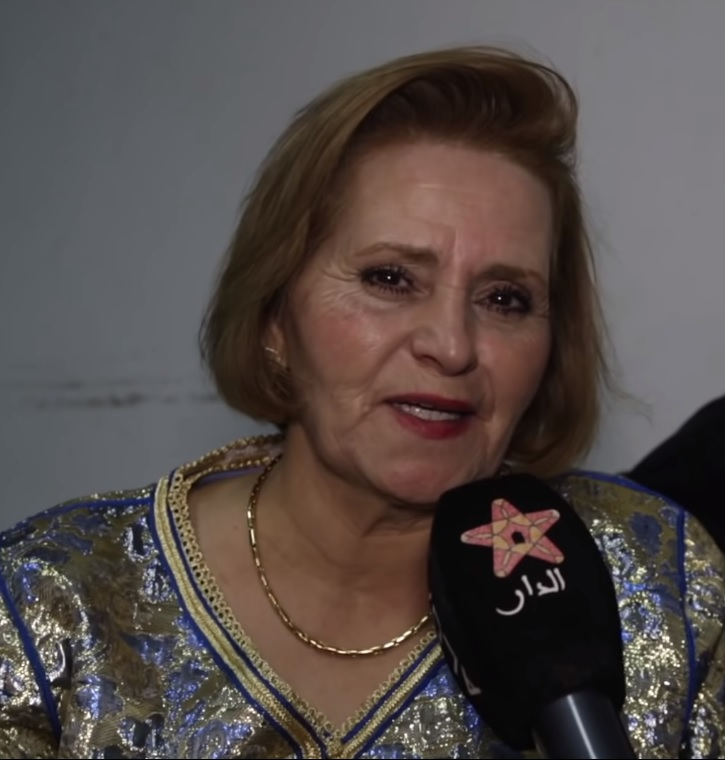
- El Bidaouia in 2019
- Born: 1953; Sbata, Morocco
- Died: 15 October 2022 (aged 69); Rabat, Morocco
- Occupation: Singer

Khadija El Bidaouia (1953 – 15 October 2022) was a Moroccan singer.

El Bidaouia was born in Sbata, Casablanca in 1953. She was a pioneer in Aita, an ancestral Moroccan music genre which has a feminist dimension. During her career, she took over a male-dominated industry of mostly sheikhs and became a favorite singer. She was respected by several Aita sheikhs and became very popular. She released multiple albums and singles, including 'La Yensani', 'Ghzali' and 'Besmlah'.

El Bidaouia died in the military hospital in Rabat from an illness on 15 October 2022, aged 69.
