= Cevat Açıkalın =

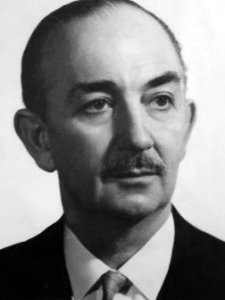
Cevat Açıkalın

Cevat Açıkalın, also known as Muhittin Mehmet Açıkalın or Mehmet Cevad Açıkalın (1901 or 1902, Istanbul – 24 May 1970), was a Turkish politician and diplomat.

== Education and career ==
Açıkalın graduated from the Faculty of Law at the University of Geneva. Throughout his career, he held various positions in the diplomatic service, including clerkships, advisory roles, and ambassadorships in different cities such as Geneva, Warsaw, Prague, Belgrade, Tehran, Moscow, London, and Rome. He also served as the Undersecretary and Deputy Secretary-General in Hatay.

== Personal life ==
Açıkalın was married to Rukiye Celadet Uşaklıgil, the sister of Latife Hanım, wife of Mustafa Kemal Atatürk, from 1923 to 1925. His father, Ali Cevat Bey, had served as the Chief Secretary to Sultan Abdul Hamid II. Açıkalın was also the brother of Hatice Açıkalın, a notable physician and teacher.

== Death ==
Açıkalın and his wife died in a traffic accident near Sapanca on 24 May 1970. He was buried at Rumelihisar Cemetery in Istanbul.
