= Louis Farrakhan =

American religious leader (born 1933)

Minister Louis Farrakhan
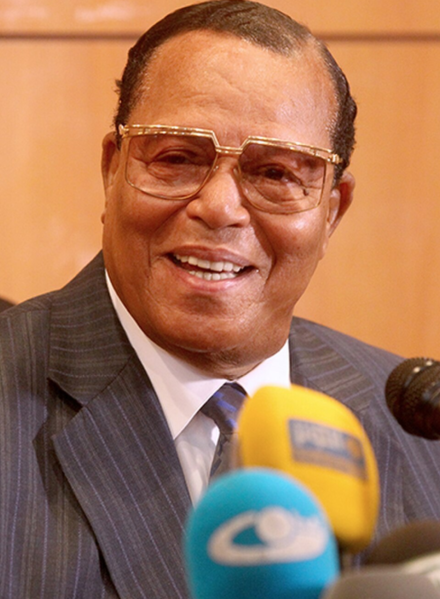
- Farrakhan in 2016

Fourth Leader of the Nation of Islam
- Incumbent
- Assumed office 1981
- Preceded by: Warith Deen Mohammed

Personal details
- Born: Louis Eugene Walcott; May 11, 1933 (age 93) New York City, U.S.
- Spouse: Khadijah Farrakhan (m. 1953; died 2026)
- Children: 9 (3 deceased)
- Relatives: Mustapha Farrakhan Jr. (grandson)
- Education: Winston-Salem State University
- Occupation: Leader of the Nation of Islam; Former calypso music singer

Louis Farrakhan (born Louis Eugene Walcott, later Louis X; May 11, 1933) is an American religious leader who has been the head of the Nation of Islam since 1981, a new religious movement which combines black nationalism and Islamic terminology. Prior to joining and leading the Nation of Islam, Farrakhan was a calypso singer who used the stage name Calypso Gene from 1950 to 1955 and a violinist from 1939 to 1955. The longest-serving Nation of Islam leader, he also served as minister of several mosques in Boston and Harlem in the 1950s under the leadership of Elijah Muhammad.

After the death of Elijah Muhammad, his son Warith Deen Mohammed reorganized the original NOI into the orthodox Sunni Islamic group American Society of Muslims. Farrakhan began to rebuild the NOI as "Final Call". In 1981, he officially adopted the name "Nation of Islam", reviving the group and establishing its headquarters at Mosque Maryam. In October 1995, Farrakhan organized and led the Million Man March in Washington, D.C. Due to health issues, he reduced his responsibilities with the NOI in 2007. However, Farrakhan has continued to deliver sermons and speak at NOI events. In 2015, he led the 20th Anniversary of the Million Man March: Justice or Else.

Farrakhan has made many statements that have been condemned as antisemitic, homophobic or racist against white people, and he has been a controversial figure for such remarks. His antisemitic statements and views have been condemned by the Southern Poverty Law Center, the Anti-Defamation League (ADL), and other organizations. Farrakhan has also been criticized for being homophobic and sexist. He has denied assertions that he is antisemitic, racist, sexist, or anti-gay. Farrakhan was banned from Facebook in 2019 along with other public figures Meta considered to be political or religious extremists, and the official Nation of Islam YouTube channel was removed for "hate speech" in 2020.

== Early life and education ==
Farrakhan, who is Black, was born Louis Eugene Walcott on May 11, 1933 in the Bronx, New York City. He is the younger of two sons of Sarah Mae Manning (1900–1988) and Percival Clark, immigrants from the Anglo-Caribbean islands. His mother was born in Saint Kitts, while his father was Jamaican. The couple separated before their second son was born, and Walcott says he never knew his biological father. Walcott was named after Louis Walcott, a man with whom his mother had a relationship after becoming separated from Percival Clark. In a 1996 interview with Henry Louis Gates Jr., Walcott speculated that Percival Clark, "a light-skinned man with straight hair from Jamaica", may have been Jewish.

After Walcott's stepfather died in 1936, the Walcott family moved to Boston, where they settled in the largely African-American neighborhood of Roxbury.

Walcott received his first violin at the age of five. By the time he was 12 years old, he had been on tour with the Boston College Orchestra. A year later, he participated in national competitions and won them. In 1946, he was one of the first black performers to appear on the Ted Mack Original Amateur Hour, where he also won an award. Walcott and his family were active members of the Episcopal St. Cyprian's Church in Roxbury.

Walcott attended the Boston Latin School, and later attended and graduated from the English High School. He completed three years at Winston-Salem Teachers College, where he had a track scholarship.

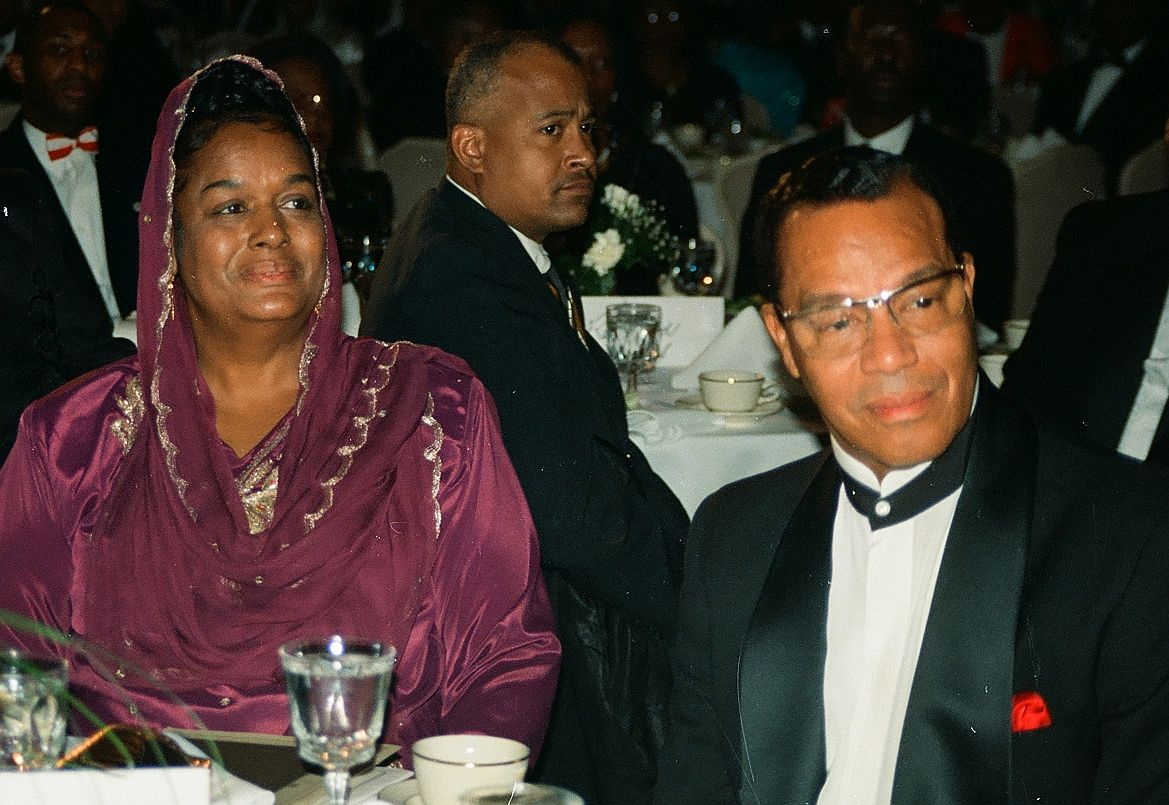
Khadijah and Louis Farrakhan, 1996

In 1953, Walcott married Betsy Ross, later known as Khadijah Farrakhan, while he was in college. Due to complications from his new wife's first pregnancy, Walcott dropped out after completing his junior year of college to devote time to his wife and their child.

== Music career ==
In the 1950s, Walcott began his professional music career as a singer billed as "The Charmer". It was during a tour in Montreal, Quebec, Canada, that he took this nickname. At this point, earning $500 a week, Walcott was touring the northeastern and midwestern United States, sometimes also using the nickname "Calypso Gene".

In 1953–1954, preceding Harry Belafonte's success with his album Calypso (released in 1956), he recorded and released a dozen cheeky, funny tunes as "The Charmer" in a mixed mento/calypso style, including "Ugly Woman", "Stone Cold Man" and calypso standards like "Zombie Jamboree", "Hol 'Em Joe", "Mary Ann" and "Brown Skin Girl". Some were reissued: "Don't Touch Me Nylon" has mild, explicit sexual lyrics as well as "Female Boxer", which contains some sexist overtones and "Is She Is, Or Is She Ain't" (inspired by Christine Jorgensen's sex change operation).

When Farrakhan joined the NOI, he was asked by Elijah Muhammad to put aside his musical career as a calypso singer. After many years, Farrakhan decided to take up the violin once more primarily due to the urging of prominent classical musician Sylvia Olden Lee.

On April 17, 1993, Farrakhan made his return concert debut with performances of the Violin Concerto in E Minor by Felix Mendelssohn. Farrakhan intimated that his performance of a concerto by a Jewish composer was, in part, an effort to heal a rift between him and the Jewish community. (Mendelssohn's family converted to Christianity). The New York Times music critic Bernard Holland reported that Farrakhan's performance was somewhat flawed due to years of neglect, but "nonetheless Mr. Farrakhan's sound is that of the authentic player. It is wide, deep and full of the energy that makes the violin gleam."'

In 2021, to celebrate the 250th anniversary of Beethoven's birth, Farrakhan performed Violin Concerto in D Major Op. 61 with the New World Symphony.

== Nation of Islam ==
In February 1955, Walcott was headlining a show in Chicago, Illinois, called Calypso Follies. There he first came in contact with the teachings of the Nation of Islam (NOI) through Rodney Smith, a friend and saxophonist from Boston. Walcott and his wife Betsy were invited to the Nation of Islam's annual Saviours' Day address by Elijah Muhammad. Prior to going to Saviours' Day, due to then-Minister Malcolm X's media presence, Walcott had never heard of Elijah Muhammad, and like many outside of the Nation of Islam, he thought that Malcolm X was the leader of the Nation of Islam.

In 1955, Walcott fulfilled the requirements to be a registered Muslim/registered believer/registered laborer. He memorized and recited verbatim the 10 questions and answers of the NOI's Student Enrollment. He then wrote a Saviour's Letter that must be sent to the NOI's headquarters in Chicago. The Saviour's Letter must be copied verbatim, and have the identical handwriting of the Nation of Islam's founder, Wallace Fard Muhammad.

After having the Saviour's Letter reviewed and approved by the NOI's headquarters in Chicago in July 1955, Walcott received a letter of approval from the Nation of Islam acknowledging his official membership as a registered Muslim/registered believer/registered laborer in the NOI. As a result, he received his "X." The "X" was considered a placeholder, used to indicate that Nation of Islam members' original African family names had been lost. They acknowledged that European surnames were slave names, assigned by the slaveowners in order to mark their ownership. Members of the NOI used the "X" while they were waiting for their Islamic names, which some NOI members received later in their conversions.

Hence, Louis Walcott became Louis X. Elijah Muhammad then replaced his "X" with the "holy name" Farrakhan, which is a corruption of the Arabic word فرقان furqan, which means "The Criterion". On a very different tone from his calypso songs, he recorded two tunes as Louis X, criticizing racism in A White Man's Heaven Is a Black Man's Hell, a record album which was issued on Boston's A Moslem Sings label in 1960. The summer after Farrakhan's conversion, Elijah Muhammad stated that all musicians in the NOI had to choose between music and the Nation of Islam.

=== Early ministry roles (1956–1980) ===
After nine months of being a registered Muslim in the NOI and a member of Muhammad's Temple of Islam in Boston, where Malcolm X was the minister, Farrakhan became his assistant minister. Eventually he became the official minister after Elijah Muhammad transferred Malcolm X to Muhammad's Temple of Islam No. 7 on West 116th St. in Harlem, New York City. Louis X wrote in the Dec. 4, 1964, issue of Muhammad Speaks, the organization's newspaper: "The dye is set and Malcolm shall not escape. Such a man is worthy of death."

After Malcolm X's assassination in 1965, Elijah Muhammad appointed Farrakhan to two prominent positions that Malcolm held before being dismissed from the NOI. Farrakhan became the national spokesman/representative of the NOI and was appointed minister of the influential Harlem Mosque, where he served until 1975. Warith Deen Mohammed, the seventh son of Elijah and Clara Muhammad, was declared the new leader of the Nation of Islam at the annual Saviours' Day Convention in February 1975, a day after his father died. He made substantial changes in the organization in the late 1970s, taking most of its members into a closer relationship with orthodox Islam, and renaming the group "World Community of Islam in the West".

Eventually, Warith Deen Mohammed renamed the group the American Society of Muslims. He rejected the deification of the Nation of Islam's founder Wallace D. Fard, the Mahdi of the Holy Qur'an, and the messiah of the Bible. Mohammed also welcomed white people—who were once considered devils and enemies by the NOI—as equal brothers, sisters, and friends. Mohammed gave some white people X's, and he extended efforts at inter-religious cooperation and outreach to Christians and Jews.

Farrakhan joined Mohammed's movement and served as a Sunni Imam under him for 3 1/2 years from 1975 to 1978. In 1978, Farrakhan distanced himself from Mohammed's movement. According to The New York Times, Farrakhan "could not embrace its new philosophy. In particular, Mr. Farrakhan opposed the concept of working with whites to solve the problems of blacks".

In 1979, Farrakhan's group founded a weekly newspaper entitled The Final Call, which was intended to be similar to the original Muhammad Speaks newspaper that Malcolm X claimed to have started.

==== Assassination of Malcolm X and aftermath ====
The day that Malcolm X was assassinated in Harlem, Farrakhan happened to be in Newark, New Jersey, on rotation, 45 minutes away from the scene of the assassination.

Farrakhan made numerous incendiary statements about Malcolm X, contributing to what was called a "climate of vilification". Three men from a Newark NOI mosque—Thomas Hagan, Muhammad Abdul Aziz (aka Norman 3X Butler) and Kahlil Islam (aka Thomas 15X Johnson)—were convicted of the killing and served prison sentences. Only Hagan ever admitted his role.

Many, including Malcolm X's family, have accused Farrakhan of being involved in the plot to assassinate Malcolm X. For many years, Betty Shabazz, the widow of Malcolm X, harbored resentment toward the Nation of Islam—and Farrakhan in particular—for what she felt was their role in the assassination of her husband. In a 1993 speech, Farrakhan seemed to confirm that the Nation of Islam was responsible for the assassination:

We don't give a damn about no white man law if you attack what we love. And frankly, it ain't none of your business. What do you got to say about it? Did you teach Malcolm? Did you make Malcolm? Did you clean up Malcolm? Did you put Malcolm out before the world? Was Malcolm your traitor or ours? And if we dealt with him like a nation deals with a traitor, what the hell business is it of yours? You just shut your mouth, and stay out of it. Because in the future, we gonna become a nation. And a nation gotta be able to deal with traitors and cutthroats and turncoats. The white man deals with his. The Jews deal with theirs.

During a 1994 interview, Gabe Pressman asked Shabazz whether Farrakhan "had anything to do" with Malcolm X's death. She replied: "Of course, yes. Nobody kept it a secret. It was a badge of honor. Everybody talked about it, yes."

In a 60 Minutes interview that aired during May 2000, Farrakhan stated that some of the things he said may have led to the assassination of Malcolm X. "I may have been complicit in words that I spoke", he said. "I acknowledge that and regret that any word that I have said caused the loss of life of a human being." A few days later Farrakhan denied that he "ordered the assassination" of Malcolm X, although he again acknowledged that he "created the atmosphere that ultimately led to Malcolm X's assassination."

=== Leadership of Nation of Islam (1981–present) ===
In 1981, Farrakhan and his supporters held their first Saviours' Day convention in Chicago, Illinois, and took back the name of the Nation of Islam. The event was similar to the earlier Nation's celebrations, last held in Chicago on February 26, 1975. At the convention's keynote address, Farrakhan announced his attempt to restore the Nation of Islam under Elijah Muhammad's teachings.

On October 24, 1989, at a press conference at the J.W. Marriott Hotel in Washington, D.C., Farrakhan described a vision which he had on September 17, 1985 in Tepoztlán, Mexico. In the vision, he was carried up to "a Wheel, or what you call an unidentified flying object", as in the Bible's Book of Ezekiel. During this experience, he heard the voice of Elijah Muhammad, the leader of the Nation of Islam. Farrakhan indicated that Elijah Muhammad "spoke in short cryptic sentences and as he spoke a scroll full of cursive writing rolled down in front of my eyes, but it was a projection of what was being written in my mind. As I attempted to read the cursive writing, which was in English, the scroll disappeared and the Honorable Elijah Muhammad began to speak to me". [Elijah Muhammad said], "President Reagan has met with the Joint Chiefs of Staff to plan a war. I want you to hold a press conference in Washington, D.C., and announce their plan and say to the world that you got the information from me, Elijah Muhammad, on the Wheel".

During that same press conference, Farrakhan stated that he believed his vision had been proven: "In 1987, in The New York Times' Sunday magazine and on the front page of The Atlanta Constitution, the truth of my vision was verified, for the headlines of The Atlanta Constitution read, 'President Reagan Planned War Against Libya.'" Farrakhan added "In the article which followed, the exact words that the Honorable Elijah Muhammad spoke to me on the Wheel were found; that the President had met with the Joint Chiefs of Staff and planned a war against Libya in the early part of September 1985".

Farrakhan visited Turkey at invitation on February 18, 1996, and met with the country's leading Islamist political figure, Necmettin Erbakan, and his Welfare Party's officials. He said that the Turkish people must decide whether it wants to have a secular or Islamic government.

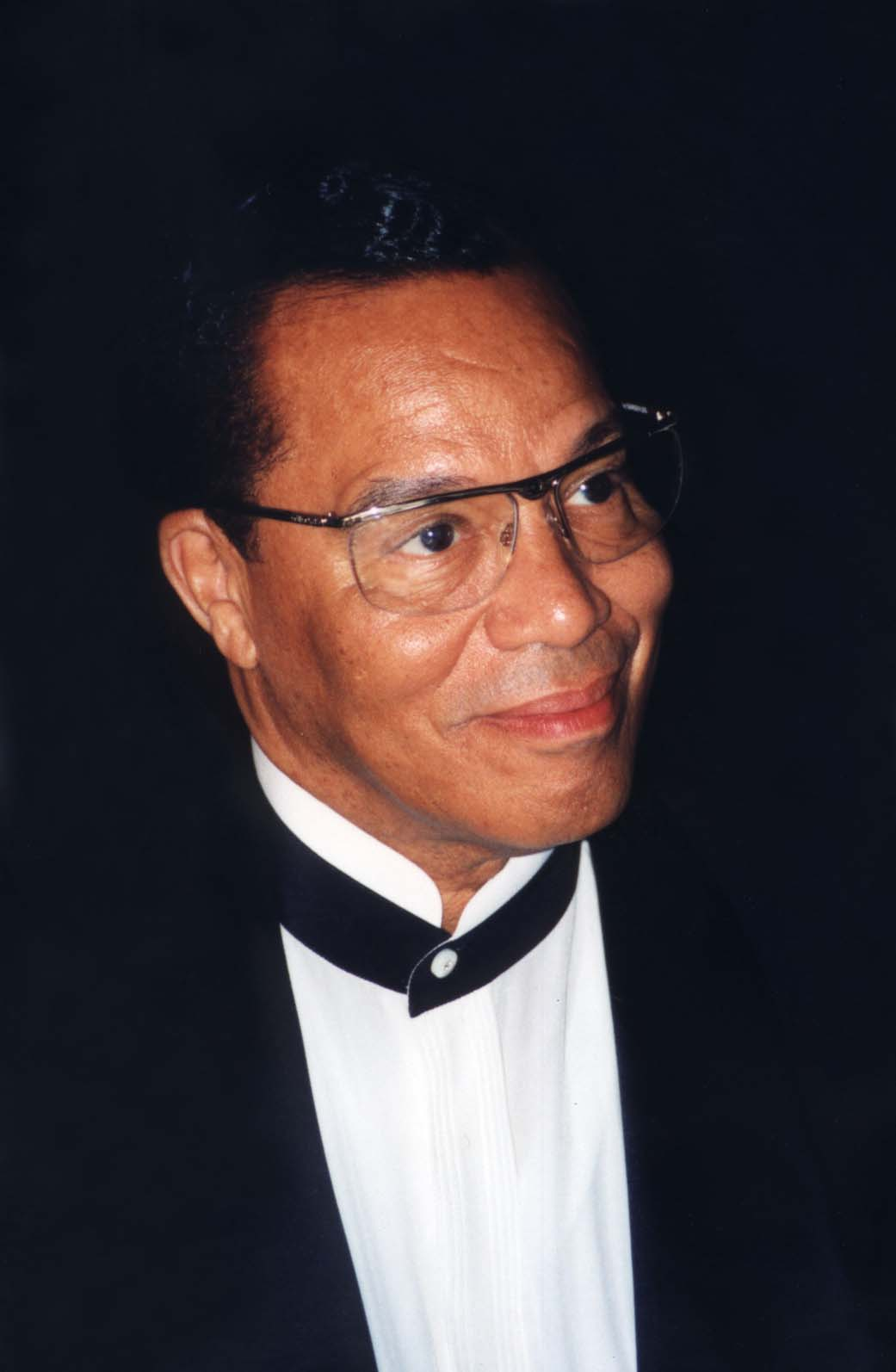
Farrakhan in 1997

==== Million Man March ====
In October 1995, Farrakhan convened a broad coalition of what he and his supporters claimed was one million men in Washington, D.C., for the Million Man March. The count however fell far below the hoped-for numbers. The National Park Service estimated that approximately 440,000 were in attendance. Farrakhan threatened to sue the National Park Service because of the low estimate from the Park Police.

Farrakhan and other speakers called for black men to renew their commitments to their families and communities. In Farrakhan's 2 1/2 hours he quoted from spirituals as well as the Old and New Testaments and termed himself a prophet sent by God to show America its evil. The event was organized by many civil rights and religious organizations and drew men and their sons from across the United States of America.

Many other distinguished African Americans addressed the throng, including: Maya Angelou; Rosa Parks; Martin Luther King III, Cornel West, Jesse Jackson and Benjamin Chavis. In 2005, together with other prominent African Americans such as the New Black Panther Party leader Malik Zulu Shabazz, the activist Al Sharpton, Addis Daniel and others, Farrakhan marked the 10th anniversary of the Million Man March by holding a second gathering, the Millions More Movement, October 14–17 in Washington D.C.

=== Succession ===
It is unknown who will lead the Nation of Islam after Farrakhan's death. Ishmael Muhammad has been speculated to be a potential successor. Before 1993, Khallid Muhammad was "the most likely heir apparent".

== Views ==
Farrakhan has been the center of much controversy with critics saying that his political views and comments are antisemitic, racist, and homophobic. Farrakhan has categorically denied these charges and stated that much of America's perception of him has been shaped by the media. His critics have labeled him a cult leader.

=== Antisemitism ===
Both the Anti-Defamation League and Southern Poverty Law Center consider Farrakhan an antisemite. Farrakhan has accused Jews of controlling large sections of the media, the US government and the global economy, regularly referring to these Jews as "Satanic". He has repeatedly described Adolf Hitler as a "great man" and claimed Jewish involvement in the Atlantic slave trade, Jim Crow laws and black oppression in general.

The Simon Wiesenthal Center included some of Farrakhan's comments on its list of the Top 10 antisemitic slurs in 2012.

In June 1984, after returning from a visit to Libya, Farrakhan delivered a sermon that was recorded by a Chicago Sun-Times reporter. A transcript from part of the sermon was published in The New York Times:

Toward the end of that portion of his speech that was recorded, Mr. Farrakhan said: "Now that nation called Israel never has had any peace in 40 years and she will never have any peace because there can be no peace structured on injustice, thievery, lying and deceit and using the name of God to shield your dirty religion under His holy and righteous name.

After it was reported that Farrakhan called Judaism the "gutter religion", he repeatedly denied referring to Judaism as such by explaining that he was instead noticing what he believed was "the Israeli Government's use of Judaism as a political tool." In a June 18, 1997, letter to a former Wall Street Journal editor Jude Wanniski he stated:

Countless times over the years I have explained that I never referred to Judaism as a gutter religion, but, clearly referred to the machinations of those who hide behind the shield of Judaism while using unjust political means to achieve their objectives. This was distilled in the New York tabloids and other media saying, 'Farrakhan calls Judaism a gutter religion.'

As a Muslim, I revere Abraham, Moses, and all the Prophets whom Allah (God) sent to the children of Israel. I believe in the scriptures brought by these Prophets and the Laws of Allah (God) as expressed in the Torah. I would never refer to the Revealed Word of Allah (God)—the basis of Jewish Faith—as 'dirty' or 'gutter.' You know, Jude, as well as I, that the Revealed Word of Allah (God) comes as a Message from Allah (God) to purify us from our evil that has divided us and caused us to fall into the gutter.

Over the centuries, the evils of Christians, Jews and Muslims have dirtied their respective religions. True Faith in the laws and Teaching of Abraham, Jesus and Muhammad is not dirty, but, practices in the name of these religions can be unclean and can cause people to look upon the misrepresented religion as being unclean.

In response to Farrakhan's speech, Nathan Pearlmutter, then Chair of the Anti-Defamation League, referred to Farrakhan as the new "Black Hitler" and Village Voice journalist Nat Hentoff also characterized the NOI leader as a "Black Hitler" while he was a guest on a New York radio talk-show.

In response, Farrakhan announced during a March 11, 1984, speech which was broadcast on a Chicago radio station:

So I said to the members of the press, 'Why won't you go and look into what we are saying about the threats on Reverend Jackson's life?' Here the Jews don't like Farrakhan and so they call me 'Hitler'. Well that's a good name. Hitler was a very great man. He wasn't great for me as a Black man but he was a great German and he rose Germany up from the ashes of her defeat by the united force of all of Europe and America after the First World War. Yet Hitler took Germany from the ashes and rose her up and made her the greatest fighting machine of the twentieth century, brothers and sisters, and even though Europe and America had deciphered the code that Hitler was using to speak to his chiefs of staff, they still had trouble defeating Hitler even after knowing his plans in advance. Now I'm not proud of Hitler's evil toward Jewish people, but that's a matter of record. He rose Germany up from nothing. Well, in a sense you could say there is a similarity in that we are rising our people up from nothing, but don't compare me with your wicked killers.

At a later meeting of the Nation of Islam at Madison Square Garden in 1985, Farrakhan said of the Jews: "And don't you forget, when it's God who puts you in the ovens, it's forever!" He has also claimed that German Jews financed the Holocaust in a speech at the Mosque Maryam, Chicago in March 1995: "German Jews financed Hitler right here in America. ... International bankers financed Hitler and poor Jews died while big Jews were at the root of what you call the Holocaust". Almost three years later at a Saviors' Day gathering in the same city, he said: "The Jews have been so bad at politics they lost half their population in the Holocaust. They thought they could trust in Hitler, and they helped him get the Third Reich on the road."

On March 23, 2002, Farrakhan visited Kahal Kadosh Shaare Shalom in Kingston, Jamaica, which was his first visit to a synagogue, in an attempt to repair his relationship with the Jewish community. Farrakhan was accepted to speak at Shaare Shalom in the native country of his father, after being rejected to appear at American synagogues, many of whom had fear of sending the wrong signals to the Jewish community.

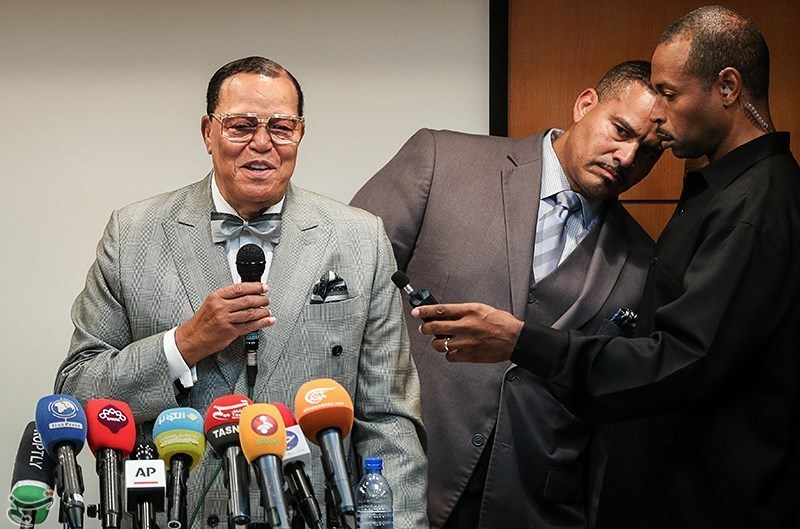
Farrakhan in Iran, 2018

Farrakhan made antisemitic comments during his May 16–17, 2013 visit to Detroit in which he accused President Obama of having "surrounded himself with Satan ... members of the Jewish community". Jews, according to Farrakhan, "have mastered the civilization now, but they've mastered it in evil". In a weekly lecture series titled "The Time and What Must Be Done", which began during January 2013, he prophesied the downfall of the United States soon and said the country faced divine punishment if his warnings were rejected.

In March 2015, Farrakhan accused "Israelis and Zionist Jews" of being involved in the September 11 attacks. (In 2012 and 2017 speeches, he said the American government were behind 9/11.) In his Saviours' Day speech in February 2018, Farrakhan described "the powerful Jews" as his enemy. He approvingly cited President Richard Nixon and the Reverend Billy Graham's derogatory comments about Jews' "grip on the media", claiming that Jews are responsible for "all of this filth and degenerate behavior that Hollywood is putting out turning men into women and women into men". On February 20, 2019, at the Nation of Islam's annual Saviour's Day gathering, Farrakhan declared, "I represent the Messiah. I represent the Jesus and I am that Jesus".

A three-hour speech by Farrakhan on July 4, 2020 was carried by Revolt TV's YouTube channel, He claimed Jonathan Greenblatt, the head of the anti-bigotry nonprofit Anti-Defamation League, is Satan, and described Alan Dershowitz as "a skillful deceiver" and "Satan masquerading as a lawyer". Greenblatt responded in a tweet: "This is routine for Farrakhan—give him a platform, he never fails to espouse hatred." Farrakhan made the factually inaccurate claim that Jews are required by their religion to poison prophets and claimed Jews had "broken their covenant relationship with God" and were the "enemy of God". However, in his speech, Farrakhan also said: "If you really think I hate the Jewish people, you don't know me at all," adding "[I've never] uttered the words of death to the Jewish people." As of July 15, 2020, Farrakhan's speech had been viewed more than 1.2 million times on YouTube.

In October 2023, Farrakhan and the Nation of Islam sued the Anti-Defamation League and the Simon Wiesenthal Center for defamation damages in the amount of US$4.8 billion, contending that the defendants have falsely characterized Farrakhan and the Nation of Islam as antisemites. The case was dismissed in April 2024.

=== Barack Obama ===
In 2008, Farrakhan publicly criticized the United States and supported then-Senator Barack Obama who was campaigning at the time to become the president of the United States of America. Farrakhan and Obama had met at least once before that time.

The Obama campaign quickly responded to convey his distance from the minister. "Senator Obama has been clear in his objections to Farrakhan's past pronouncements and has not solicited the minister's support," said Obama spokesman Bill Burton. Obama "rejected and denounced" Farrakhan's support during an NBC presidential debate.

Following the 2008 presidential election, Farrakhan explained, during a BET television interview, that he was "careful" never to endorse Obama during his campaign. "I talked about him—but, in very beautiful and glowing terms, stopping short of endorsing him. And unfortunately, or fortunately, however we look at it, the media said I 'endorsed' him, so he renounced my so-called endorsement and support. But that didn't stop me from supporting him."

On May 28, 2011, Farrakhan, speaking at the American Clergy Leadership Conference, lambasted Obama over the wars in Iraq and Afghanistan and the intervention in Libya, calling him an "assassin" and a "murderer". "We voted for our brother Barack, a beautiful human being with a sweet heart," Farrakhan said, in a video that was widely shared on the Internet. "But he has turned into someone else," Farrakhan told the crowd. "Now he's an assassin."

=== Dianetics ===
A connection between the Church of Scientology and the Nation of Islam is reported to date from the late 1990s when Farrakhan was introduced to its teachings by the musician Isaac Hayes, who was the Church of Scientology's International spokesman for its World Literacy Crusade.

On May 8, 2010, Farrakhan publicly announced his embrace of Dianetics and has actively encouraged Nation of Islam members to undergo auditing from the Church. Although he has stressed that he is not a Scientologist, but only a believer in Dianetics and the theories related to it, the Church honored Farrakhan previously during its 2006 Ebony Awakening awards ceremony (which he did not attend). Farrakhan has also urged European Americans to join the Church of Scientology, stating in his 2011 Saviour's Day speech, "All white people should flock to [Scientology founder] L. Ron Hubbard." Reportedly, according to the SPLC, Hubbard was a racist who supported the apartheid regime in South Africa.

Since the announcement in 2010, the Nation of Islam has been hosting its own Dianetic courses and its own graduation ceremonies. At the third such ceremony, which was held on Saviours Day 2013, it was announced that nearly 8,500 members of the organisation had undergone Dianetic auditing. The Organisation announced it had graduated 1,055 auditors and had delivered 82,424 hours of auditing. The graduation ceremony was certified by the Church of Scientology, and the Nation of Islam members received official certification. The ceremony was attended by Shane Woodruff, vice-president of the Church of Scientology's Celebrity Centre International. He stated that "The unfolding story of the Nation of Islam and Dianetics is bold, it is determined and it is absolutely committed to restoring freedom and wiping hell from the face of this planet."

=== Donald Trump ===
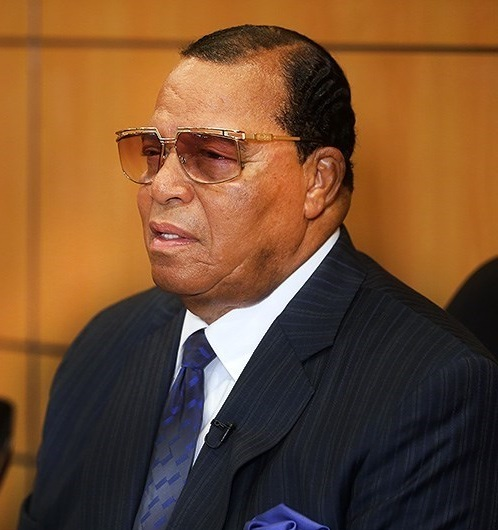
Louis Farrakhan in 2016

During the 2016 Republican Party presidential primaries, Farrakhan praised Republican candidate Donald Trump as the only candidate "who has stood in front of the Jewish community and said 'I don't want your money.'" While he declined to endorse Trump outright, he said of Trump, "I like what I'm looking at." In 2018, Farrakhan again praised Trump for "destroying every enemy that was an enemy of our rise". He included the Department of Justice and the Federal Bureau of Investigation (FBI) in this group.

Conservative pundits Candace Owens and Glenn Beck both took note of Farrakhan's position, with Owens saying, while she did not "endorse Farrakhan's views", it remained a "really big deal" that Farrakhan had "aligned himself with Trump's administration" and Beck declaring that "the enemy of my enemy is my friend" and urged "reconciliation" between conservatives and Farrakhan.

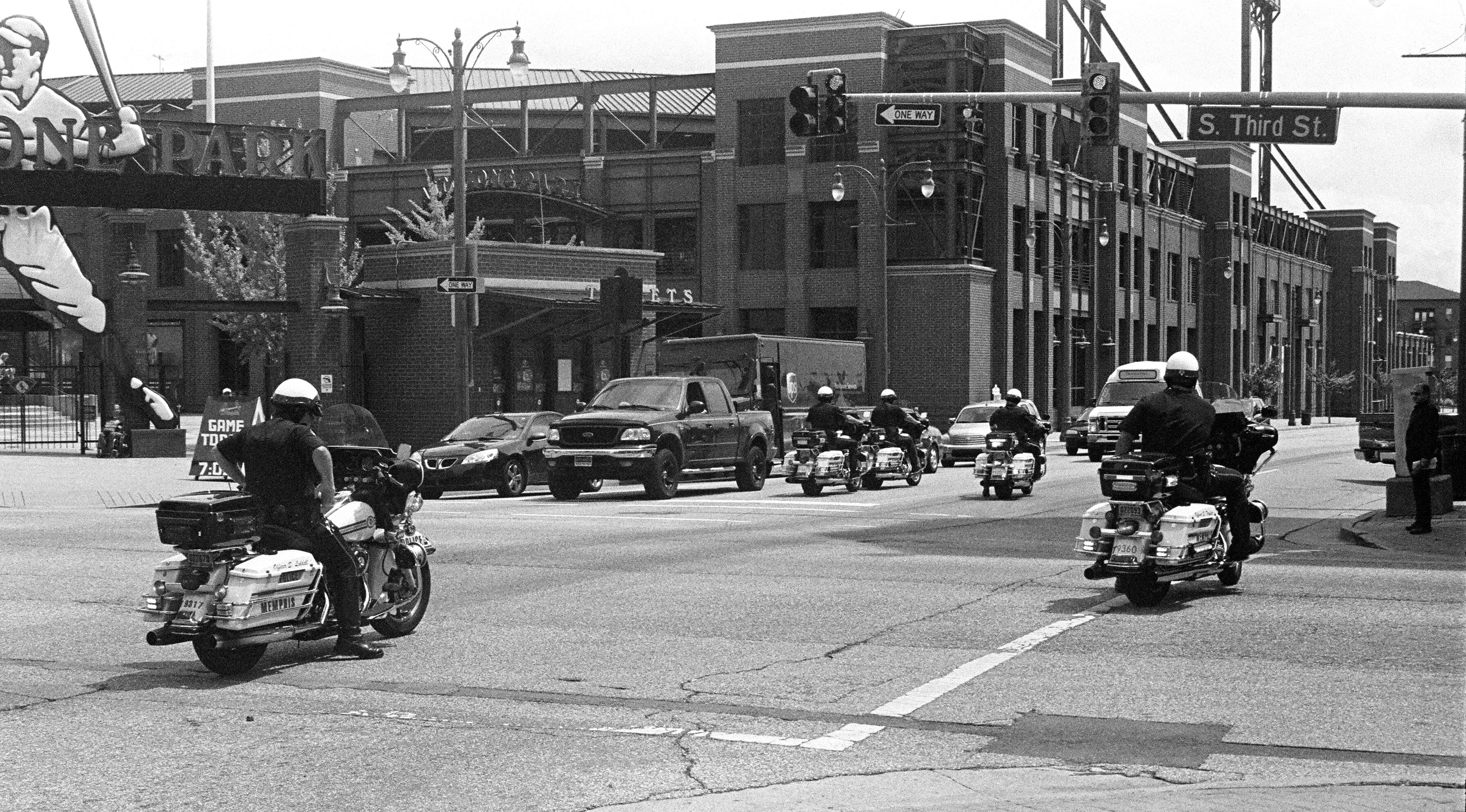
Farrakhan's police escort in Memphis, Tennessee, 2015

=== Hurricane Katrina ===
In comments in 2005, Farrakhan stated that there was a 25-foot (7.6 m) hole under one of the key levees that failed in New Orleans following Hurricane Katrina. He implied that the levee's destruction was a deliberate attempt to wipe out the population of the largely black sections within the city. Farrakhan later said that New Orleans Mayor Ray Nagin told him of the crater during a meeting in Dallas, Texas.

Farrakhan further claimed that the fact the levee broke the day after Hurricane Katrina is proof that the destruction of the levee was not a natural occurrence. Farrakhan has raised additional questions and has called for federal investigations into the source of the levee break. He also asserted that the hurricane was "God's way of punishing America for its warmongering and racism".

Experts including the Independent Levee Investigation Team (ILIT) from the University of California, Berkeley have countered his accusations. The report from the ILIT said "The findings of this panel are that the over-topping of the levees by flood waters, the often sub-standard materials used to shore up the levees, and the age of the levees contributed to these scour holes found at many of the sites of levee breaks after the hurricane."

=== Racism and black supremacy ===
The Anti-Defamation League classifies Farrakhan as a racist, and the Southern Poverty Law Center considers the Nation of Islam (NOI) a hate group with a theology of black supremacy. According to the SPLC, the NOI has a "lengthy record" of antisemitism, promotes black separatism, and asserts that black people are superior to white people. According to the NOI, whites were created 6,600 years ago as a "race of devils" by an evil scientist named Yakub, a story which originated with the founder of the NOI, Wallace D. Fard.

The NOI's division into two factions after Elijah Muhammad's death was caused in part by the fact that new leader Warith Mohammed wished to reject the Yakub myth, while national spokesman Farrakhan wanted to reaffirm it. At an event in Milwaukee in August 2015, Farrakhan said: "White people deserve to die, and they know, so they think it's us coming to do it".

=== Sexism ===
Farrakhan's song "Female Boxer" contains some sexist overtones.

Farrakhan received sexual discrimination complaints filed with a New York state agency when he banned women from attending a speech he gave in a city-owned theater in 1993. The next year he gave a speech only women could attend. In his speech for women, as The New York Times reported,

Mr. Farrakhan urged the women to embrace his formula for a successful family. He encouraged them to put husbands and children ahead of their careers, shun tight, short skirts, stay off welfare and reject abortion. He also stressed the importance of cooking and cleaning and urged women not to abandon homemaking for careers. 'You're just not going to be happy unless there is happiness in the home,' Mr. Farrakhan said at the Mason Cathedral Church of God in Christ in the Dorchester section, not far from the Roxbury neighborhood where he was raised by a single mother. 'Your professional lives can't satisfy your soul like a good, loving man.'

Farrakhan (among others) was sued by Marceline Donaldson and her husband Robert Bennett because Donaldson could not attend a 1994 speech by Farrakhan due to being a woman. In 2002 the Supreme Judicial Court of Massachusetts ruled that it was legal for Donaldson to be turned away because the public accommodation laws of Massachusetts did not require women to be admitted to a men's mosque meeting; a mosque had leased a theater for the speech.

== Relationship with Muammar Gaddafi ==
Over the course of his international travels, Farrakhan met with a number of prominent world leaders, particularly during his 1996 World Friendship Tour. These included Nelson Mandela in South Africa, Muammar Gaddafi in Libya, Fidel Castro in Cuba, Saddam Hussein in Iraq, Jerry Rawlings in Ghana, and Sani Abacha in Nigeria. He also met officials in Iran during events marking the Iranian Revolution.

Back in 1985, Farrakhan obtained working capital in the amount of $5 million, in the form of an interest-free loan from Libya's Islamic Call Society to be repaid within 18 months which was to be used to create a toiletries firm with black employees. Libyan leader Muammar Gaddafi had also offered Farrakhan guns to begin a black nation. Farrakhan said that he told Gaddafi that he preferred an economic investment in black America.

In January 1996, when Farrakhan visited Libya, Gaddafi pledged giving him a gift of $1 billion and a personal award of $250,000. As economic activity between the two countries had been restricted by the US government since 1986 following allegations of Libya's connection to terrorism, the financial transfer was blocked. It was unclear if Gaddafi would have been in a position to finance the money transfer.

At the time of the wider uprisings in the Arab world and the Tsunami in Japan in a Chicago press conference on March 31, 2011, Farrakhan said President Obama's action in supporting the rebels in Libya were going to advance the arrival of UFOs, or divine spaceships, as punishments for black sufferings. Depicting Obama as engulfed by the people surrounding him, he said: "The stupid mistake that we make is to think that the president is the supreme power. Never was. Money is the power in America. … All of you know what I'm talking about, Zionist control of the government of the United States of America." When Gaddafi was killed in October 2011, Farrakhan blamed Obama's advisors whom he called "wicked demons".

== Social media ==
Farrakhan lost his verified status on his Twitter posts in June 2018, denying him full verification, after asserting the Harvey Weinstein scandal was about "Jewish power". The following October, Twitter said that it would not suspend Farrakhan's account after he posted a tweet that compared Jews to termites: Twitter substantiated its inaction by stating that he had not broken the site's rules. After a Twitter rule change on hateful conduct in July 2019, the tweet—"I'm not an anti-Semite. I'm anti-Termite"—was removed.

At the beginning of May 2019, Farrakhan was banned from Facebook, along with other prominent individuals considered by the company to be extremists, with antisemitism believed to be the reason for Farrakhan's removal.

During a speech at Saint Sabina Catholic Church in Chicago a week later, Farrakhan stated he had "never been arrested" for "drunken driving" and asked: "What have I done that you would hate me like that?" The Nation of Islam said his speech was Farrakhan's response to the "public outrage over the unprecedented and unwarranted lifetime ban" from Facebook. He insisted he was neither a misogynist nor a homophobe and that: "I do not hate Jewish people". Blase J. Cupich, the Archbishop of Chicago, condemned the decision of the church in allowing Farrakhan to speak there.

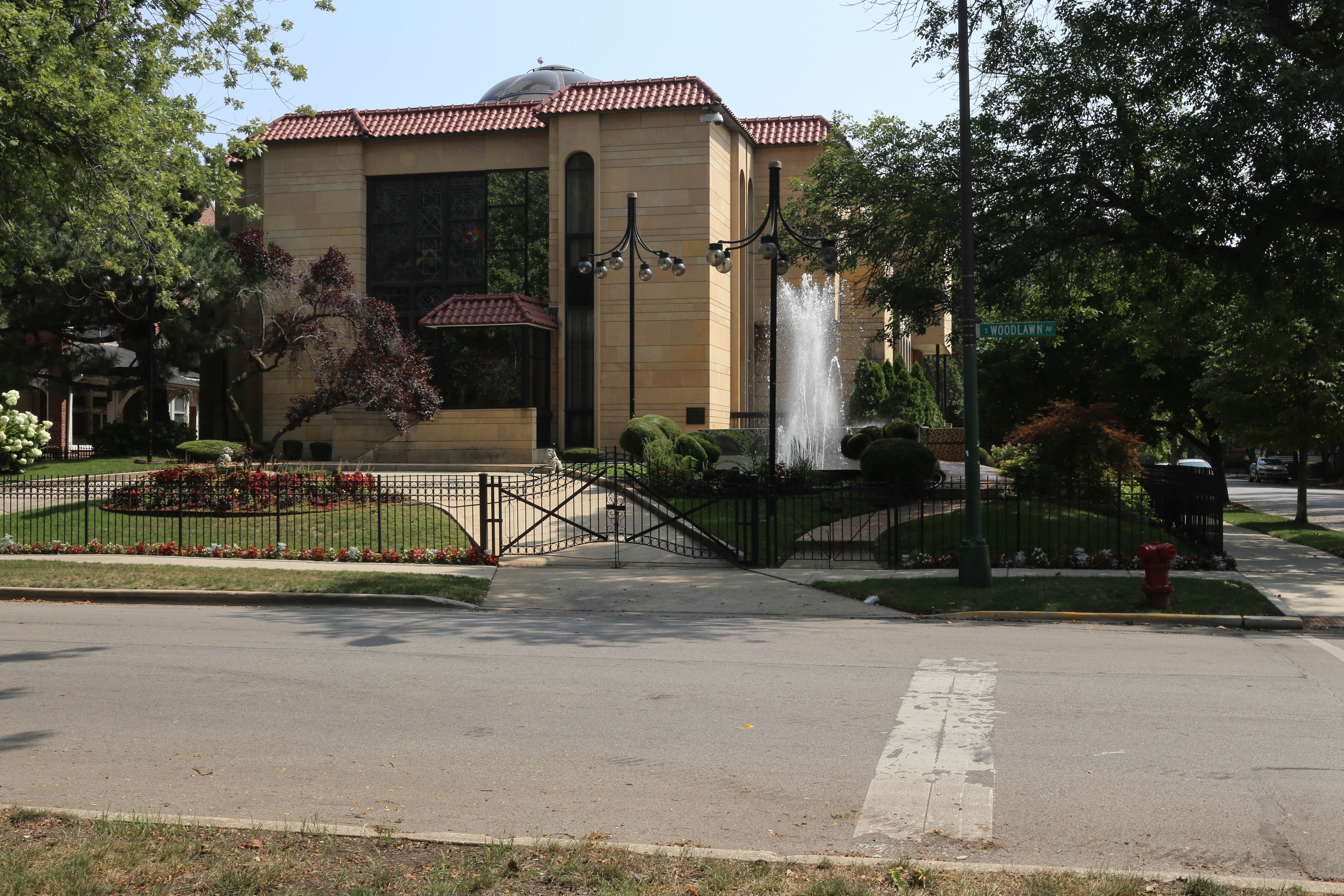
Farrakhan's home in Kenwood, Chicago, 2018

== Personal life ==
=== Family ===
Farrakhan was married to Khadijah Farrakhan from 1953 until her death on June 27, 2026. He is the father of nine children and the grandfather of basketball player Mustapha Farrakhan Jr. Farrakhan's eldest son, Louis Jr., died on June 2, 2018; his second eldest son, Joshua, died on November 18, 2023; and the death of his eldest daughter, Betsy Jean, was announced on September 19, 2026.

=== Health ===
Farrakhan announced that he was seriously ill in a letter on September 11, 2006. The letter was directed to his staff, the Nation of Islam members, and supporters. The letter, published in The Final Call newspaper, said that doctors in Cuba had discovered a peptic ulcer. According to the letter, Farrakhan lost 35 pounds (16 kg) due to subsequent infections, and he urged the Nation of Islam leadership to carry on while he recovered.

Farrakhan was released from his five-week hospital stay on January 28, 2007, after major abdominal surgery. The operation was performed to correct damage caused by side effects of a radioactive "seed" implantation procedure that he received years earlier to successfully treat prostate cancer.

Following his hospital stay, Farrakhan released a "Message of Appreciation" to supporters and well-wishers and weeks later delivered the keynote address at the Nation of Islam's annual convention in Detroit.

In December 2013, Farrakhan announced that he had not appeared publicly for two months because he had suffered a heart attack in October.

== Awards ==
- 2005, a Black Entertainment Television (BET) poll voted Farrakhan the 'Person of the Year'.

== See also ==
- Nation of Islam and antisemitism
- African American–Jewish relations
- Black theology
- Black separatism
- The Hate That Hate Produced
- The Secret Relationship Between Blacks and Jews
- Mustapha Farrakhan Jr.
- 1972 Harlem mosque incident
