= Khadija Gayibova =

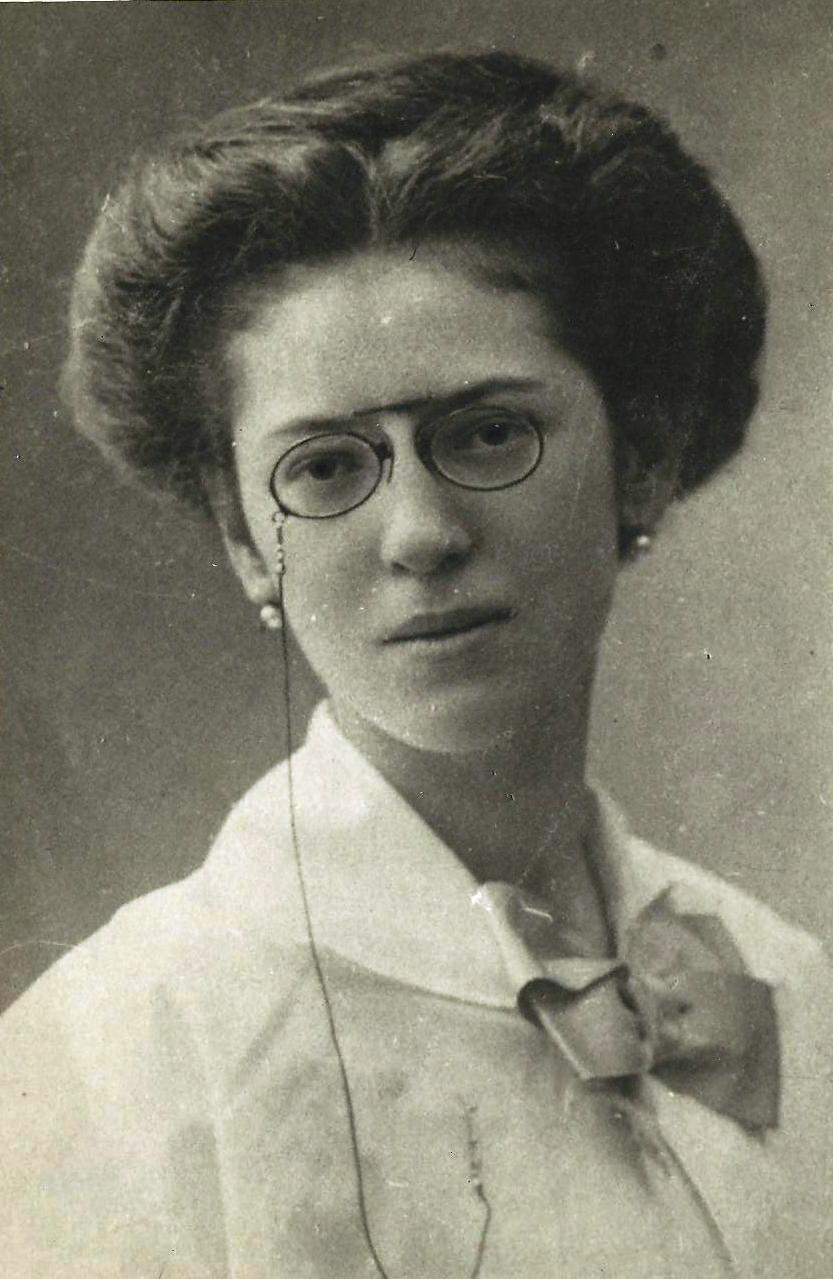

Background information
- Born: May 24, 1893; Tbilisi, Georgian Governorate, Russian Empire (present-day Tbilisi, Georgia)
- Died: 27 October 1938 (aged 45) Baku, Azerbaijan SSR, Soviet Union
- Occupation: Educator
- Instrument: Piano

Khadija Osman bey qizi Gayibova (Azerbaijani: Xədicə Qayıbova) (24 May 1893 – 27 October 1938) was an Azerbaijani pianist from Georgia in the then USSR. Gayibova died in Stalin's Great Purge of the 1930s.

== Early life ==
Khadija Gayibova (née Muftizadeh) was born in the city of Tiflis (present-day capital of Georgia). Her father, Osman Muftizadeh, was an Azeri Sunni Muslim scholar, while her mother hailed from the Teregulov family of Volga Tatar origin who settled in Tiflis in 1845. Gayibova was trained in piano while studying at the St. Nina Gymnasium for Girls between 1901 and 1911. After graduating at age 18, she married engineer Nadir Gayibov, son of Mirza Huseyn Afandi Qayibov and brother of Nigar Shikhlinskaya. For the next several years, she taught at the local Russian-Muslim school.

== Career ==
She became known as one of the first Azerbaijani musicians to perform mugham (an Azeri folk music genre) on piano. In 1919, Gayibova moved to Baku with her family. She was one of the founders of the Azerbaijan State Conservatory in 1920. After Sovietization, she became head of the Department of Oriental Music in the Azerbaijan People's Commissariat for Education. During this period, Gayibova organized short-term piano and drama classes for women. In 1927, she was admitted to the Azerbaijan State Conservatoire specialising as a composer.

== First arrest ==
In 1933, Gayibova was arrested and incarcerated allegedly for espionage and counter-revolutionary activity. She was released three months later and the charges were dropped due to lack of evidence. In the following year she was employed by the Azerbaijan State Conservatoire to research Azerbaijan's folk musical heritage.

== Second arrest and death ==
Outgoing and social, the Gayibovins held musical "salons" for foreign visitors, many from Turkey, and also attracting musicians, poets, writers, academics, and artists to gather there. The salons began to come to the attention of Soviet authorities who viewed them in a political context, suspecting relations with the Turkish government.

On 17 March 1938, shortly after her husband's second arrest, Gayibova, now a target for spy allegations, was arrested once again and accused of maintaining links with the Musavat party. For the next five weeks, she was interrogated nine times, until found guilty on the charges of espionage. Gayibova did not plead guilty and according to her former fellow inmate Zivar Afandiyeva (wife of executed statesman Sultan Majid Afandiyev), while incarcerated, she believed that she would be exiled to Siberia at most.

However, on 19 October 1938, after a 15-minute final court hearing, Gayibova was sentenced to execution by firing squad. The sentence was carried out at Baku.

== Exoneration ==
In 1956, at the request of Gayibova's daughter Alangu Sultanova, Gayibova's case was reviewed, and she was officially exonerated.
