= Khadija Salum Ally Al-Qassmy =

Tanzanian politician

Member of Parliament

Personal details
- Born: 5 April 1958 (age 68)
- Party: Civic United Front
- Occupation: Politician, Teacher, Businesswoman

Khadija Salum Ally Al-Qassmy (born April 5, 1958) is a Member of Parliament in the National Assembly of Tanzania. She is a member of the Civic United Front party. From 1978–1990 she was a teacher within the Ministry of Education of Zanzibar. Aside from her political career she has been a self-employed businesswoman since 1991.
