= Khadijah Farrakhan =

Wife of Louis Farrakhan (1935–2026)

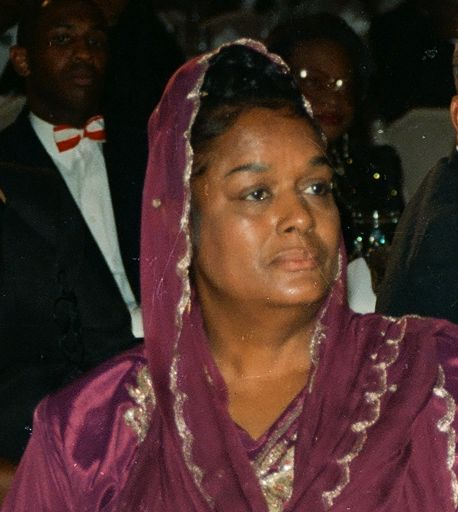
- Farrakhan in 1996
- Born: Betsy Ross; November 26, 1935; Boston, United States
- Died: June 27, 2026 (aged 90); United States
- Resting place: Oak Woods Cemetery
- Other name: Mother Khadijah
- Occupation: Political activist
- Spouse: Louis Farrakhan (m. 1953)
- Children: 9 (3 deceased)
- Relatives: Mustapha Farrakhan Jr. (grandson)

Khadijah Farrakhan (born Betsy Ross; November 26, 1935 – June 27, 2026) was the wife of Louis Farrakhan, the leader of the Nation of Islam. She was known as the "First Lady of the Nation of Islam".

== Biography ==
Khadijah Farrakhan converted to Islam with her husband Louis Farrakhan (then Louis Eugene Walcott) in 1955, when they had been married for two years. She spoke at the Million Woman March in 1997. Khadijah and Louis Farrakhan were the parents of nine children. The Farrakhans' eldest son, Louis Farrakhan Jr., died on June 2, 2018.

Farrakhan died on June 27, 2026, at the age of 90.
