= Khadija Qalanjo =

Somalian singer(1950-2025)

Khadija Qalanjo خديجة قلنجو
- Born: May 11, 1950; Borama, British Somaliland (now Somalia)
- Died: August 30, 2025 (aged 75)
- Genre: Somali music
- Occupations: singer, dancer
- Instrument: vocals
- Years active: 1970s–1980s

Khadija Qalanjo (Somali: Khadiija Qalanjo, Arabic: خديجة قلنجو) (11 May 1950 - 30 August 2025) was a popular Somali singer and folklore dancer in the 1970s and 1980s. She was also the first Miss Somalia.

She was born in Borama, Awdal and hails from the Jibril Younis sub-clan of the Samaroon clan.

== Music ==
Popular songs by Qalanjo include:

- Caashaqa Sal iyo Baar
- Ragga iyo Haweenkuba
- Deesha
- Sharaf
- Hooyo
- Soohor Caashaqa – duet with Hasan Adan Samatar
- Diriyam – in 2016 a cover was made by the Ethiopian Jano Band.
