= Charkint District =

Charkint چارکنت
- District
- Location within Afghanistan
- Coordinates: 36°30′00″N 67°20′00″E
- Country: Afghanistan
- Province: Balkh

Area
  - Total: 1,357 km^{2} (524 sq mi)
- Elevation: 1,920 m (6,300 ft)

Population
  - Total: 32,306

Charkint, or Chahar Kint, (Dari: چارکنت) is a district in Balkh province, Afghanistan. It has a population of 32,306. The district administration is located in Shar Shar area of Charkint district, which means "four clusters/towns" - from Persian chahār, "four", and Sogdian kand, "town". The area of the district is 1,357 square kilometres (524 sq mi).

== See also ==
- Districts of Afghanistan
