= Ahmed Hassan Awke =

Somali journalist from 1972 to 2015

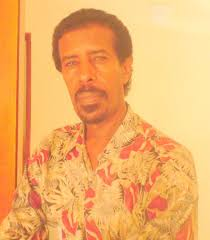
- Born: 1943; Wajaale, British Somaliland
- Died: 17 November 2015 (aged 66–67); Jigjiga, Ethiopia
- Education: Amoud High School
- Occupation: Journalist
- Years active: 1972–2015
- Spouse: Saadiya Abdillahi Salad
- Children: 5

Ahmed Hassan Awke (1943 – 17 November 2015) (Somali: Axmed Xasan Cawke) (Arabic: احمد حسن عوكة) was a veteran Somali journalist, who spent most of his life in the media industry. Awke is often considered to be one of the best Somali journalists because of his very linguistic eloquence, and was often used as a favorite commentator. He served as a special reporter for Somalia's late president Siad Barre until it collapsed in 1991. He hailed from the Jibril Abokor, a Sa'ad Musa sub-division of the Habr Awal Isaaq clan that predominately inhabits the Gabiley region.

== Early life ==
Ahmed Hassan Awke was born in the border town of Tog-Wajale in 1943. His father Hassan Awke was a well-known businessman in Somaliland.

As a child, he grew up in Tog-Wajale, but after completing Qur'anic education at a madrasa he moved to the town of Adadley, where he completed his primary and secondary school education. He graduated from higher education in Berbera in 1971, where he taught for a year as a teacher.

== Career ==
Awke began his career at Radio Mogadishu in 1972, and then become a reporter at Somali National Television in 1983.
In 1996, he joined the BBC Somali and then moved to VOA Somali in 2007. He also worked with Horn Cable TV, Universal TV and Somaliland National TV, Somaliland's state-run television channel.
The former president of Somalia Hassan Sheikh Mohamud said that Awke has made a significant contribution to the history of Somalia.

== Death ==
He died on 17 November 2015 in Jijiga, Ethiopia. He was buried the next day in Tog-Wajale, his home town.

== See also ==
- Radio Mogadishu
- Somali National Television
- Somaliland National TV
- BBC
- VOA
- Universal TV
- Horn Cable Television

== Literature ==
- Magaalo, Mustafe Cismaan (2018). Codkarkii Caanka Ahaa (Cawke). Cairo: Hiil Press. OCLC 1135063665.
