= Mass media in Somalia =

Mass media in Somalia includes various radio, television, print and internet outlets. The federal government operates two official radio and TV networks, which exist alongside a number of private and foreign stations. Print media in the country is progressively giving way to news radio stations and online portals, as internet connectivity and access increases. In February 2013, the Ministry of Information, Posts and Telecommunication also launched a broad-based consultative process for the reformation of media legislation.

== Radio ==
The first radio communications were started by the Italians in Mogadishu in the late 1950s: the same Guglielmo Marconi supervised the radio station messages in the capital of Italian Somalia, that were the first in all Africa. Successively a public "radio service" was started (in Italian language) in 1938, but was limited to broadcast only in the area of Mogadishu-Genale-Villabbruzzi.

Radio Mogadishu is the federal government-run public broadcaster. Established in 1951 in Italian Somaliland as a follow-up of the "Radio Mogadiscio", it initially aired news items in both Somali and Italian. The station was later modernized with Russian assistance following independence in 1960, and began offering home service in Somali, Amharic and Oromo. After closing down operations in the early 1990s due to the civil war, the broadcaster was officially re-opened in August 2001 by the Transitional National Government.

Actually there are a number of radio news agencies based in Somalia. Radio is the most important and effective communication channel in the country and the most popular type of mass media. In total, about one short-wave and over ten private FM radio stations broadcast from the capital, with several radio stations airing from the central and southern regions and from Puntland. Most radio stations in Somalia are members of Network 2013, an association of local radio stations and a forum for national media leaders.

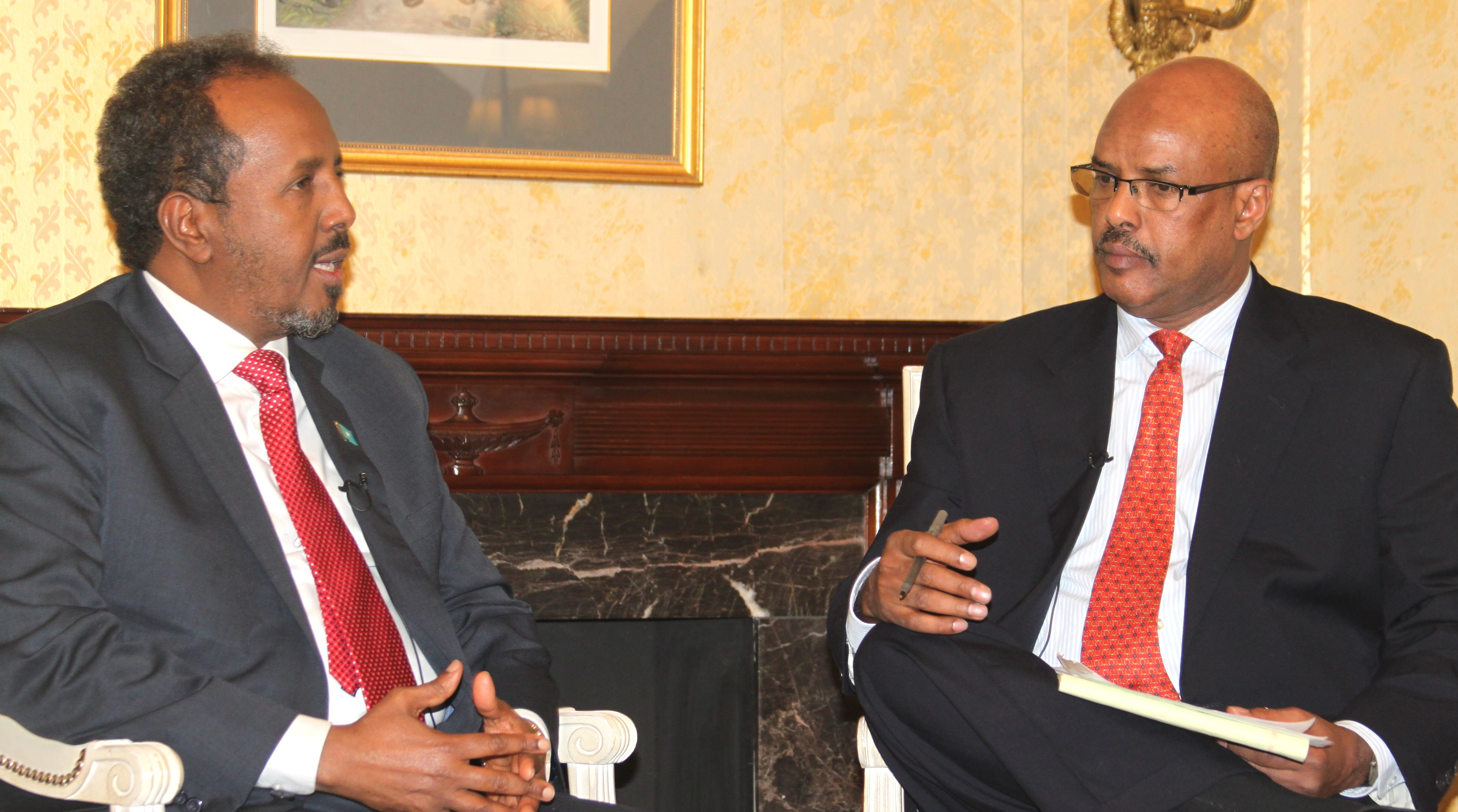
President of Somalia Hassan Sheikh Mohamud speaking with the Somali press.

Other radio stations headquartered in Mogadishu include Ugbaad Media Mustaqbal Radio, Radio Shabelle, Ugbaad Media Radio Bar-Kulan, Radio Kulmiye, Radio Dannan, Radio Dalsan, Radio Banadir, Radio Maanta, Gool FM, Radio Xurmo, and Radio Xamar, also known as Voice of Democracy.

Radio stations of south central Somalia include Radio Dhusamareb, Radio Codka Nabada/Radio Abud-Waq, Codka Mudug, Radio Hobyo, Radio Galguduud, and Codka Gobollada Dhexe (Voice of Central Somalia).

The northeastern Puntland region has over a dozen private radio stations. Radio Garowe is based in Garowe, the state's administrative capital. Radio Daljir is Puntland's largest radio station. With a studio in Garowe and its main headquarters in Bosaso, the commercial capital of Puntland, the broadcaster's network of 7 FM transmitters reaches most of Puntland as well as part of the neighboring Galmudug region to the south. Also centered in Bosaso with its studios in Garowe is the Somali Broadcasting Corporation, Puntland's oldest and second largest private radio station. In addition, Horseed Radio, Al Xigma, and One Nation Radio have headquarters in Bosaso. Radio Gaalkacyo, formerly known as Radio Free Somalia, operates from Galkayo in the north-central Mudug province, as does Codka Nabada (Voice of Peace), and Radio Hage. Other radio stations broadcasting from Puntland include Radio Hikma, Radio Badhan and Somali Public Radio.

Additionally, the Somaliland region in the northwest has one government-operated radio station, Radio Hargeisa (Radio Somaliland). Established in 1943 in the former British Somaliland protectorate as the first Somali language station, it broadcasts mostly in Somali but also features news bulletins in Amharic, Arabic and English.

As of 2007, transmissions for two internationally based broadcasters were available.

Station	Language	Establishment	Hub
Horseed Media	Somali, English	2008	Bosaso
Radio Astaansan	Somali	2021	Mogadishu
Puntland TV and Radio	Somali	2013	Garowe
Radio Gaalkacyo	Somali, English	1993	Galkayo
Radio Garowe	Somali	2004	Garowe
Mustaqbal Radio	Somali	March 15, 2012	Mogadishu
Radio Dalsan	Somali English	April 01, 2012	Mogadishu
Risaala Radio	Somali	April 24, 2011	Mogadishu
Goobjoog FM	Somali, English	2012	Mogadishu
Radio Shabelle	Somali, English	2002	Mogadishu
SBC Radio	Somali, Arabic, English	2001	Bosaso
Som Production	Somali	2019	Mogadishu
Star FM Radio	Somali	2005	Mogadishu
Radio Hiddo	Somali	2015	Mogadishu

== Television ==
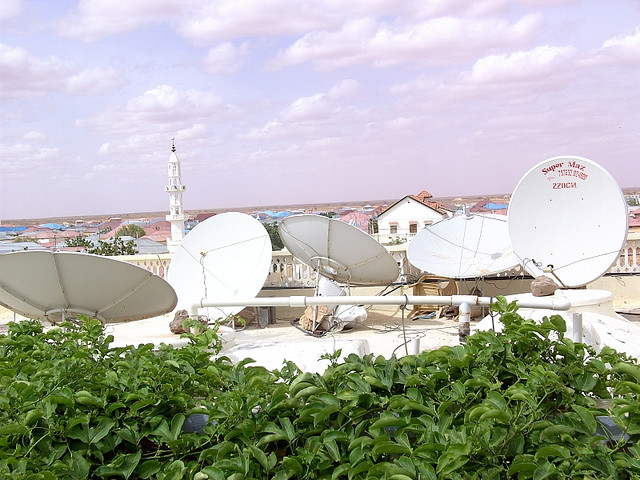
Some satellite services in Puntland.

Somalia has one official government-run television station in addition to a number of private networks. The Mogadishu-based Somali National Television (SNTV) is the central government-owned broadcaster. On April 4, 2011, the Ministry of Information of the Transitional Federal Government officially re-launched the station as part of an initiative to develop the national telecommunications sector. SNTV broadcasts 24 hours a day, and can be viewed both within Somalia and abroad via terrestrial and satellite platforms. The Somaliland region also has one local government-operated TV channel, Somaliland National TV (SLNTV), which broadcasts from the provincial capital of Hargeisa. Puntland TV and Radio likewise airs from Garowe.

The private stations Eastern Television Network (ETN TV) and Somali Broadcasting Corporation (SBC TV) broadcast from Bosaso, Puntland's commercial hub. Horn Cable Television (HCTV), as well as Somaliland Space Channel air from Hargeisa.

Two private channel re-broadcasts of Al-Jazeera and CNN are also available.

There are likewise several Somali-owned private television stations headquartered abroad, which broadcast to Somalia. Among these are Somali TV of Minnesota, and Dalmar TV of Columbus, Ohio. Universal TV airs from London, and is the first and largest Somali television satellite network of its type. Royal TV and Somali Channel TV also broadcast to Somalia from their UK studios.

Channel	Language	Establishment	Hub
Somali Cable TV	Somali	2015	Muqdisho
Eastern Television Network	Somali	2005	Bosaso
Horn Cable Television	Somali	2003	Hargeisa
Puntland TV and Radio	Somali	2013	Garowe
SBC TV	Somali, Arabic, English	2001	Bosaso
Shabelle TV	Somali	2002	Mogadishu
Somali National Television	Somali, Arabic, English	1983	Mogadishu
Goobjoog TV	Somali, English	2012	Mogadishu

== Print and online ==
Historically the first newspapers in Somalia were printed in Italian Mogadishu in the 1930s, like the "Il Littoriale". After World War II was started the newspaper "Corriere della Somalia" in Italian & English, that was the main newspaper in Somalia even during the Italian Trust Territory of Somaliland when was printed in Italian with a few pages in Arabic.

During the Barre regime from 1969 to 1991 there were up to five newspapers in the country. The press was at the time strictly regulated and there was very little press freedom. The newspapers were Xiddigta Oktoobar (Somali language, government owned), Najmatu Oktober (Arabic language, government owned), Heegan (English language, government owned), Ogaal (Somali language, owned by ruling party), Aldaleeca (Arabic language, privately owned)

At the start of the civil war all of the established newspapers collapsed together with TV and Radio channels. In the vacuum many new newspapers appeared, but many of them were connected to the fighting factions and warlords and have been seen as biased and sometimes low quality.

In the early 2000s, print media in Somalia reached a peak in activity. Around 50 newspapers were published in Mogadishu alone during this period, including Qaran, Mogadishu Times, Sana'a, Shabelle Press, Ayaamaha, Mandeeq, Sky Sport, Goal, The Nation, Dalka, Panorama, Aayaha Nolosha, Codka Xurriyadda and Xiddigta Maanta.

In 2003, as new free electronic media outlets started to proliferate, advertisers increasingly began switching over from print ads to radio and online commercials in order to reach more customers. A number of the broadsheets in circulation subsequently closed down operations, as they were no longer able to cover printing costs in the face of the electronic revolution. In 2012, the political Xog Doon and Xog Ogaal and Horyaal Sports were reportedly the last remaining newspapers printed in the capital.

However, according to Issa Farah, a former editor with the Dalka broadsheet, newspaper publishing in Somalia is likely to experience a resurgence if the National Somali Printing Press is re-opened and the sector is given adequate public support.

Online news outlets covering Somalia's regions includes Faafiye.com, WardheerNews, Dulqaadka News Jamhuria, Keydmedia Online, Puntlandi, Hiiraan Online, Jowhar Online, Bar-Kulan, Saxafi Media News, Waheen Media Group, Dillapress, JubbaLand News, Somali Channel, Somali Inside News, SomaliPost, Goobjoog, and Raxanreeb Online. Since 2022, there is also Bilan Media, a Somali newspaper composed exclusively of women, founded in 2020 with the support of the United Nations Development Programme. The first network to publish in Maay Maay is Arlaadi Media Network.

Somali Newspapers
Newspaper	Language	Establishment	Hub
AllSBC	Somali	–	Bosaso
Dalmar Press	Somali	2006–	Mogadishu
Dillapress	Somali, Arabic, English	2009	Dilla
Geeska Afrika	Somali, English	2003	Hargeisa
Dawan Tribune	Somali, Arabic, English	2000	Hargeisa
Garowe Online	Somali, English	2004	Garowe
Horseed Media	Somali, English	2002	Bosaso
Mareeg Media	Somali, English	2002 (2019)	Mogadishu
Ogaal Newspaper	Somali, English	2005	Hargeisa
Puntland Post	Somali, English	2001	Garowe
Somali Posts	English	2020	Mogadishu
Somali Inside News	English	2024	Mogadishu
Radio Mogadishu	Somali, Arabic, English	2011	Mogadishu
Shabelle Media Network	Somali, English	2002	Mogadishu
Somali News Network	Somali, English	2025	Mogadishu

== Press freedom ==
After the collapse of the central government and the start of the civil war in the early 1990s, media in Somalia was essentially unregulated. Journalists had unrestricted freedom to write and publish stories without editorial oversight, and many took an active role in the conflict's propaganda battle. The National Union of Somali Journalists was formed in 2002, in response to an attempt by the short-lived Transitional National Government to re-establish regulation over the industry through what NUSOJ characterized as a "repressive" media law.

== Regulation ==
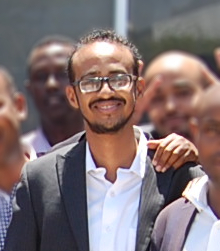
Senior Media Advisor to the government, Abdisalam Aato.

On March 22, 2012, the Somali Cabinet unanimously approved the National Communications Act, which paves the way for the establishment of a National Communications regulator in the broadcasting and telecommunications sectors. The bill was passed following consultations between government representatives and communications, academic and civil society stakeholders. According to the Ministry of Information, Posts and Telecommunication, the Act is expected to create an environment conducive to investment and the certainty it provides will encourage further infrastructural development, resulting in more efficient service delivery.

On August 1, 2012, a new Provisional Constitution was adopted, which includes several statutes related to the media profession. Article 16 of the supreme law assures freedom of association, with the related Articles 20, 21 and 23 guaranteeing freedom of assembly, demonstration, protest and petition, freedom of movement and residence, and freedom of trade, occupation and profession, respectively. Article 24 governs labour relations, including the right to form, join and participate in labour unions, to engage in collective bargaining, to receive protection from discrimination, harassment and segregation in the workplace, and the right to strike. Article 18 specifically pertains to freedom of expression and opinions for media workers, among others:

(1) Every person has the right to have and express their opinions and to receive and impart their opinion, information and ideas in any way.

(2) Freedom of expression includes freedom of speech, and freedom of the media, including all forms of electronic and web-based media.

(3) Every person has the right to freely express their artistic creativity, knowledge, and information gathered through research.

In February 2013, Prime Minister Abdi Farah Shirdon launched an Independent Task Force on Human Rights in order to firm up on the protection of individual rights. The 13-member committee of volunteers was formed after extensive consultations with civil society groups and the Speaker of Parliament, Mohamed Osman Jawari. Chaired by prominent human rights attorney Maryam Yusuf Sheikh Ali, one of four women on the panel, the Task Force includes a media representative, an educator, peace activist, leaders of Somali women's organizations, senior police officers, a humanitarian campaigner, and a religious leader. It is tasked with investigating allegations of journalist intimidation and violence. At the end of its three-month mandate, the committee is scheduled to publish a report on its findings and recommended courses of action. The Task Force will eventually give way to a permanent parliamentary Human Rights Commission, which will have the capacity to investigate allegations over a longer period.

In February 2013, the Ministry of Information, Posts and Telecommunication announced that the government was opening the 2007 Somali media law for consultation. The bill had been passed by the former Transitional Federal Parliament, with little input from members of the press vis-a-vis media operation and journalistic professional standards. In an effort at reform, the ministry organized two workshops on Communication and Media to collect advice from local journalists on the drafting of a new Somali media law, including a February 18, 2013 gathering in Mogadishu that was attended by 45 media stakeholders. Several additional workshops were conducted by the National Union of Somali Journalists, after which point reporters chose a panel of media representatives to present the assembled feedback at a later conference scheduled for March 21, 2013. Also overseen by the Ministry of Information, Posts and Telecommunication, the consultative meeting was held at the Aden Adde International Airport and attended by over 30 Somali media organizations, international media law experts, publishers and NGOs. It concluded with a series of recommendations for the drafting of inclusive media legislation consistent with international best practices.

On 1 September 2014, in a meeting chaired by Prime Minister Abdiweli Sheikh Ahmed, the Federal Cabinet approved the new Draft Media Bill. The legislation was welcomed by the National Union of Somali Journalists and other local media groups, who urged public institutions to adhere to the bill once implemented. Among other clauses, the new law proposes the establishment of an Independent Media Council. According to Minister of Information Mustaf Ali Duhulow, after having consulted with Somali journalists and directors, the media bill was put before the Federal Parliament for deliberation during its fifth legislative session.

== See also ==
- List of journalists killed during the Somali civil war
- Communications in Somalia
- Cinema of Somalia

== Bibliography ==
- "Somalia". Freedom of the Press. USA: Freedom House. 2016. OCLC 57509361.
