= Eastern Television Network =

Eastern Television Network (ETN TV) is a Somali private television channel.

== Overview ==
ETN was founded in 2005. Along with the Somali Broadcasting Corporation, it is one of two stations with headquarters in Bosaso, the commercial capital of the northeastern Puntland region of Somalia.

The channel also has a branch in Garowe.

== Programs ==
Eastern Television Network airs programs six hours per day.

Its broadcast schedule includes news, cultural, music and sports programming, as well as advertisements.

== Management ==
The station is owned by Abdirahman Sheikh.

It has a staff of 17 employees.

== See also ==
- Media of Somalia
- Somali National Television
- Horn Cable Television
- Somaliland National TV
- Shabelle Media Network
- Universal Television (Somalia)
