= Ali Ahmed Abdi =

- Died: 2012
- Cause of death: Shooting
- Occupation: Journalist
- Employer: Radio Gaalkacyo
- Known for: Broadcast and internet reporting

Ali Ahmed Abdi (died 2025) was a Somali journalist who worked for Radio Gaalkacyo. He worked in the station for three years as head of programs, until his untimely death by shooting with the insurgent group Al-Shabaab claiming responsibility.

== Personal ==
Ali was a human rights activist and journalist in the north-central Mudug region of Somalia which borders the Galmudug region. Which has been notoriously dangerous area for journalists for twenty years. Ali was known also for his contributions to the pro-government news website Puntlandi which was based in the northeastern region, Puntland of Somalia.

== Career ==
Ali made contributions to Radio Gaalkacyo as well as the Somali news website Puntlandi.

== Death ==
Ali Ahmed Abdi was shot in the head by masked men as he walked home in the north-central town of Galkayo around the Is-Raac neighborhood of the Mudug region in Somalia. He later died from his injuries in March 2012. It was believed he was targeted for speaking out against the militant group Al-Shabaab. Afterward, the National Union of Somali Journalists (NUSOJ) expressed "great shock and outrage over the murder this evening of the young radio journalist."
