= Maryan Seylac =

Somali Journalist

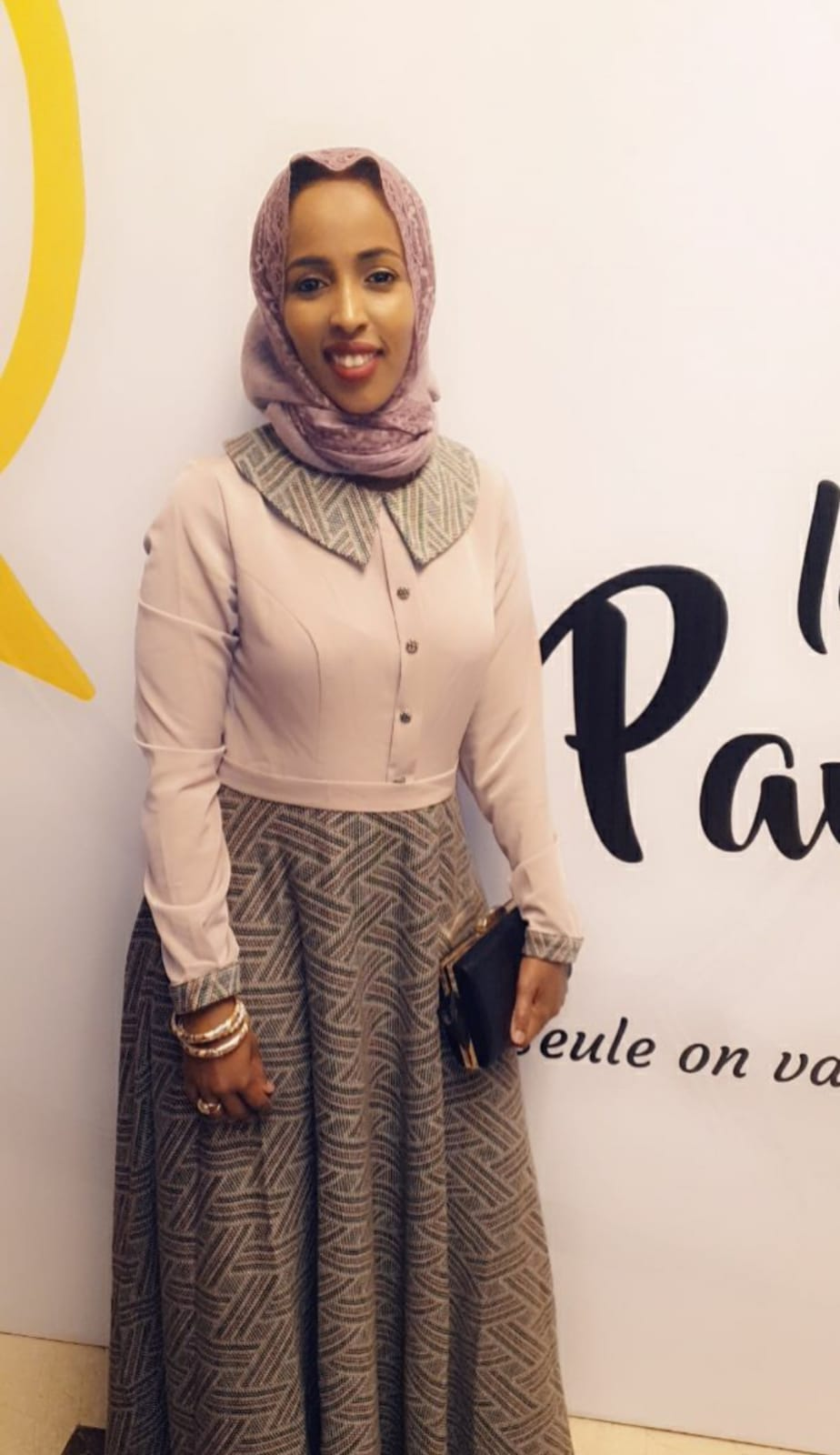
- Seylac, June 2020
- Born: 1 January 1987 (age 39); Baidoa, Somalia
- Education: Kenya Institute of Mass Communication, University of Bedfordshire
- Occupation: Journalist
- Years active: 2005–present
- Known for: Journalism, activism

Maryan Seylac (sometimes referred to as Marian Zeila; born 1987) is a Somali journalist, women's rights activist as well as founder and Executive Director of the Somali Women Media Association (SOMWA).

== Background and education ==
Seylac was born in Baidoa to a father who was a teacher. She was raised in the same town but finished her primary school at Abdulahi Bin zubeyr (Abda-azam) in Mogadishu. She completed high school in Al-hikma, still in Mogadishu before attending the Kenya Institute of Mass Communication (KIMC) where she offered journalism. As 2020, she is studying Health and Social Care at the University of Bedfordshire in the United Kingdom.

== Career ==
Seylac briefly worked as a teacher after high school in Baidoa. She later started out as a news anchor at a local radio station, and received on-the-job training as she worked at a number of local stations in the cities of Baidoa, Mogadisho and Bosaso. She was a news anchor as well as reporter on both Universal TV and Royal TV in the United Kingdom.

In 2006, Seylac founded Somali Women Media Association (SOMWA) as an effort to increase the number of females present in Somali media.

Seylac left Somalia for Kenya and then England in 2009 due to insecurity in Somalia and after receiving a number of death threats from Al-Shabab militants on account of her being a female media practitioner.

== See also ==
- Mass media in Somalia

== External sources ==
- Somali Media Women Association (SOMWA)
