= Propaganda in the War in Somalia (2006–2009) =

Even before the beginning of the War in Somalia (2006–2009) there were significant assertions and accusations of the use of disinformation and propaganda tactics, classed as forms of information warfare, by various parties to shape the causes and course of the conflict. These include assertions of falsification of the presence or number of forces involved, exaggeration or minimisation of the casualties inflicted or taken, influence or control of media outlets (or shutting them down), and other informational means and media to sway popular support and international opinion.

Low literacy rates in Somalia, estimated at between 17% and 19%, also greatly impact the effect of propaganda within the country (see related article on literacy in Somalia).

== Claims of propaganda ==
Referring to the UN Security Council resolution to support IGASOM, a Kenyan diplomat said, "Unfortunately, the [U.N.] resolution was sponsored by the United States, and it will be used by the Courts as a propaganda tool. But at least there's a window." Muslims also were considered to believe US claims of Al Qaeda activity was part of a propaganda campaign waged by Washington:

In her most blunt assessment yet, Assistant Secretary of State for African Affairs Jendayi Frazer last week accused the Islamic council of being controlled by "East Africa Al Qaeda cell individuals."

Islamists dismiss such allegations as Western propaganda, though some concede that the council is struggling to strike a balance between its moderate and fundamentalist factions.

Al Qaeda, for their part, have not been silent on the issue. On July 1, 2006, a Web-posted audio message purportedly recorded by Osama bin Laden urged Somalis to build an Islamic state in the country, and warned all nations that his al Qaeda network would fight against them if they intervened there.

External powers such as Ethiopia and Eritrea have also been accused of propaganda to drum up domestic support for the conflict. Eritrea even claims the assertions it has troops involved in Somalia is part of a disinformation campaign being waged against it by Ethiopia. Once the TFG and Ethiopian troops advanced into areas previously controlled by the Islamic Courts Union (ICU), there were allegation of rape, robbery and massacre committed by the Ethiopian troops which the TFG claimed were false accusations by ICU supporters for the consumption of Human Rights organizations.

== Claims of troops and casualties ==
One of the greatest debates has been over the presence or quantity of troops of the various external powers involved. There were various claims of involvement of Ethiopia before its open admission of presence in Somalia, as well as speculation and arguments about the quantity of troops both before and after the admission. One claim by the ICU put the number of Ethiopian troops at 35,000. Ethiopia consistently insisted it had a "few hundred" advisors in the country until it increased its admission to "3,000 - 4,000." Independent claims put Ethiopian strength at anywhere between 8,000 and 20,000. Eritrea consistently denies presence of any troops in the country, though the TFG and Ethiopia both consistently accuse it of having up to 2,000 troops in Somalia. Other assertions include a wide range of other nations contributing troops, from Uganda to Islamic nations from which mujahideen have volunteered.

Casualty reports have also conflicted, where one side might claim to have lost only a few troops while the opponent claimed to have inflicted hundreds. The positions of advance have also been disputed, such as one report where the ICU claimed to be within 10 km of Baidoa; the government denied the ICU had advanced that far. Such claims and counter-claims have been common in the conflict.

== Media manipulation and repression ==
Media manipulation, including the arrest of journalists (such as the September arrest of Radio Simba journalist Osman Adan Areys) and journalist union leaders, has been an issue in ICU-controlled areas of the country. The ICU also shut down East Africa (Mogadishu) and HornAfrik (Kismayo) radio stations.

On the other side, the TFG was accused of shutting down FM Radio Warsan in Baidoa in 2006 and again in January 2007 and arresting numerous journalists attempting to report on Ethiopian troops in Baidoa. In November 2007, the federal government and Ethiopian troops were crawling down of freedom of press.

On January 15, 2007, the TFG closed the radio stations for Shabelle Radio, Horn Afrik, IQK, and the television station Al-Jazeera in Mogadishu, without stating a reason. Later, it was said the radio stations had ties to the Ayr clan, which supported the Islamic Courts, and, according to government spokesman Abdirahman Dinari, had broadcast reports about government soldiers: "They said our soldiers were looting the markets and harassing people, which was totally untrue... They are using the media to undermine the government. They have been doing this for months." An employee of one of the broadcasters said the government "doesn't want free media that really give people the real information. They want distorted information... they don't want us to say the Ethiopian armies are supporting the government." The media ban was lifted the next day, on January 16.

=== Iran media ===
The Iran state funded news agency, Press TV, has been accused of spreading propaganda by Ethiopians, using the term "intentional errors" to describe reporting on several issues from a pro-Insurgent point of view, a claim taken up by many media organizations in the west.

== See also ==
- Internet censorship and surveillance in Somalia
- List of journalists killed during the Somali civil war
- Media of Somalia
- Somali Civil War
- War in Somalia (2006–2009)
- War in Somalia (2009–present)
