= December 2018 Mogadishu bombing =

Suicide car bombing in Somalia

On 22 December 2018, a suicide car bombing occurred in Mogadishu, Somalia. The bomber detonated it at a military checkpoint near Somalia's presidential palace, killing at least 16 people and wounding more than 20 others. Those killed include soldiers and three staff members of Universal Television. The injured include an MP and a deputy mayor of Mogadishu.

Jihadist group al-Shabaab claimed responsibility for the attack.
