= Horseed Media =

News media based in Puntland

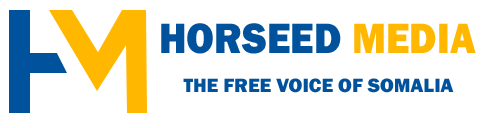

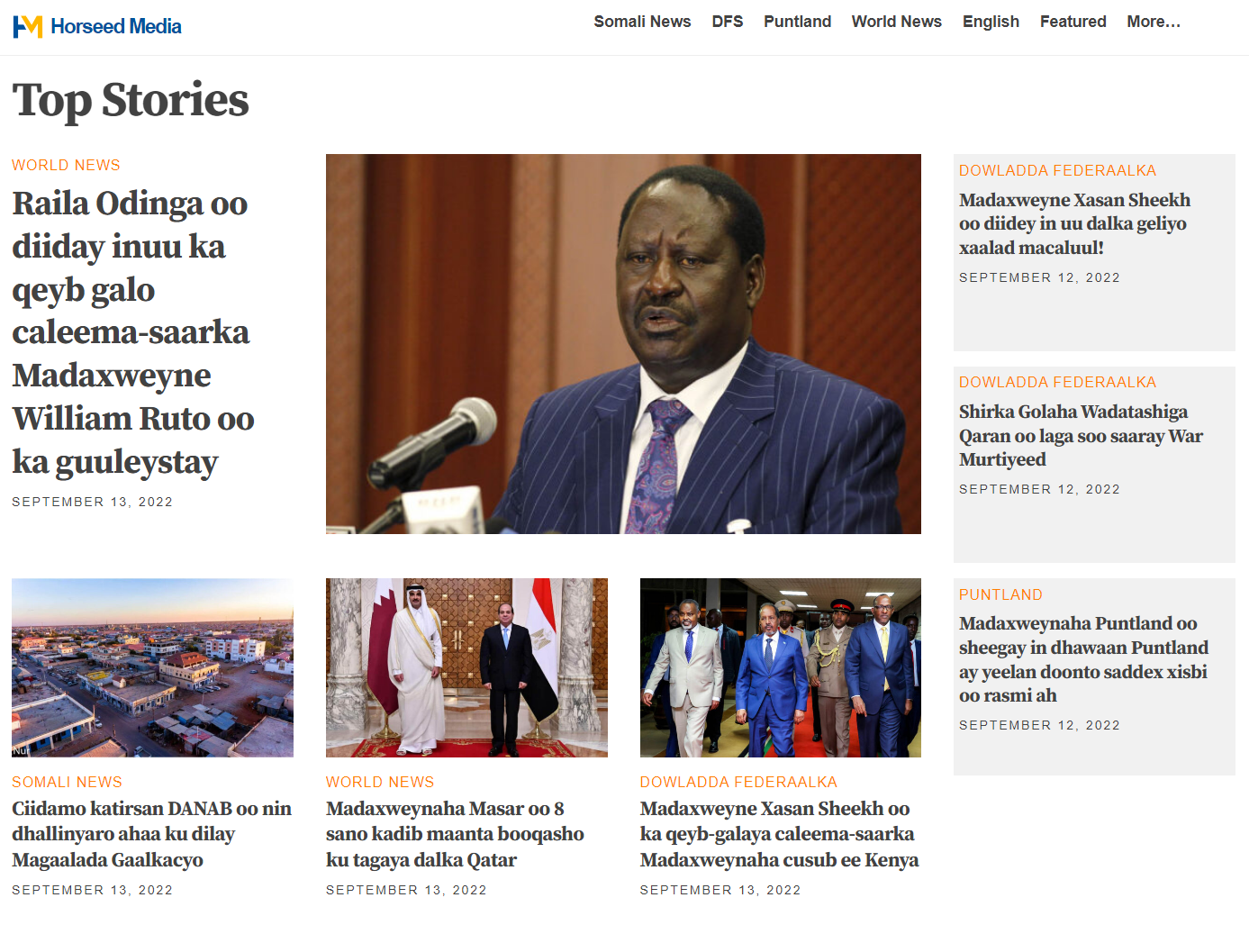
- Website type: Private
- Available in: Somali language, English language
- Founded: 2008
- Country of origin: Puntland
- Founders: Aw Musse Ismail, Mahad Mussa Ahmed
- Industry: Mass media
- Website: https://horseedmedia.net
- Launched: 5 April 2008
- Current status: Active

Horseed Media is a Mass media and news website established in April 2008 by a group of Somali diaspora members in the Netherlands and Finland, headquartered in Bosaso.

== History ==
Since its establishment, Horseed Media has made an extensive contribution in highlighting the socio-economic issues in the country, media skills development and advocating for democracy and human rights.

Horseed Media journalists have faced hostilities and censorship from the authorities in Somalia. In June 2007 the deputy director of Horseed, Abdulkadir Mohamed Nunow, was arrested and held for one day after interviewing kidnapped westerners. On October 18, 2010, a bomb attack on the headquarters of Horseed Media radio in Bosaso destroyed the reception office of the radio; journalists and staff members who were at the studio at the time of the attack escaped unhurt, however. The International Federation of Journalists condemned the attack and urged the Puntland authorities to investigate the incident and bring the perpetrators to account. In October 2012, the Puntland administration shut down the Horseed Media radio station in Bosaso, a move that later prompted Reporters Without Borders to write an open letter to the then-president of Puntland, Abdirahman Farole, requesting an explanation for the closure of the radio. On August 9, 2017, the semi-autonomous Puntland administration detained Horseed Media journalist Omar Saeed Mohammed without charges.

== Recognition ==
In 2008, Horseed Media took part in the United Nations Reham Al-Farra Memorial Journalists’ Fellowship Programme, in New York. Nine junior and mid-level print and broadcast journalists representing media organizations in Bahrain, Brazil, Gabon, Israel, Jordan, Saint Kitts and Nevis, Somalia, South Africa, and Turkey took part in the program.

The European Journalism Centre’s MediaLandscape.Org recognized Horseed Media in 2018 as one of the “constantly reliable” Somali news websites out of hundreds they have evaluated. Similarly, the Internews Network recognized Horseed Media as one of the more reliable websites, asserting that "It has a network of reporters in the region and is widely considered to be a trustworthy source of news."

According to a BBC Media Action analysis of Somalia media in 2011, Horseed Media's radio station had "one of the strongest reputations in Puntland".

== See also ==
- Mass media in Somalia
