= Somali National Television =

Somali state media

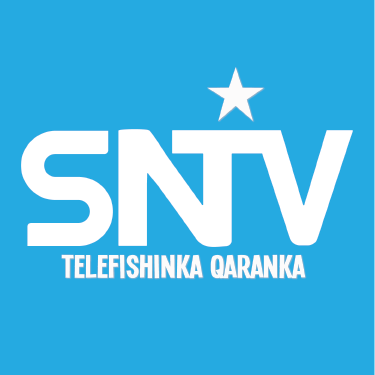
- Industry: Broadcasting
- Founded: 17 Aug 1983; 43 years ago 4 April 2011; 15 years ago (re-launch)
- Headquarters: Mogadishu, Somalia
- Area served: Somalia & abroad (satellite)
- Owner: Federal Government of Somalia
- Website: https://sntv.so/

Somali National Television (SNTV) (Somali: Telefishinka Qaranka Soomaaliyeed, abbreviated TQS) is the state media television station owned by Federal Government of Somalia.

== History ==
=== Telefishanka J. D. Soomaaliya ===
The first regular TV services began in Somalia on 17 August 1983, with funds obtained from Kuwait and the United Arab Emirates with programmes in two languages (in Somali and Arabic) for two hours daily and three hours on Fridays and holidays, ceasing its operation during the civil war. Before its launch, the Ministry of Information and National Guidance set plans for two transmitters: 100 watts and 500 watts respectively.

Initially it was known as Telefishanka J.D. Soomaaliya (Television of the Somali D.R.). Not much further information from this phase exists. Somali journalist Axmed Siciid had a news program on the channel in its beginnings called Todobaadkii Hore Iyo Aduunka (The Past Week and Around the World). During the Siad Barre government, reception was limited to Mogadishu and its surroundings. The station broadcast on VHF channel 6, three hours per evening (four on Fridays).

During the interim, the facilities were taken over on 27 April 2002 by Artan Ali Warsame to the Ministry of Information of the transitional administration.

=== Re-launch ===
On March 18, 2011, the Ministry of Information of the Transitional Federal Government began experimental broadcasts of the new television channel. SNTV used the Thaicom satellite at relaunch time, the same one as private stations like Universal TV, Somali Channel and Horn Cable TV. After a 20-year hiatus, the station was shortly thereafter officially re-launched on April 4, 2011.

SNTV broadcasts 24 hours a day, and can be viewed both within Somalia and abroad via terrestrial and satellite platforms.

Somali National Television is the principal public service broadcaster in Somalia. Headquartered in Mogadishu, the nation's capital, its main responsibility is to provide public service broadcasting throughout the country.

SNTV is regulated by the Ministry of Information, Posts & Telecommunication of the Somali Council of Ministers.

In 2021, Finnish NGO Vikes assisted in training for new children's programs and the improving of SNTV's equipment.

Even with the 20-year hiatus, SNTV still considers 1983 to be the year of its establishment. In 2022, it held a special ceremony for the 39th anniversary of the channel.

On February 9, 2025, SNTV inaugurated its new studios, built with help from Italian cooperation agency CIMIC. Later, on July 18, SNTV's satellite reception was improved following the opening of the Media Satellite Teleport.

== SNTV Daljir ==
In 2021, SNTV2 started broadcasting. The channel devotes its schedule mainly to human interest topics. This was replaced by SNTV Daljir, on November 23, 2022, created to counter Al-Shabaab propaganda.

== Ban in Somailland ==
According to reports from Garowe Online's Twitter account, the Information Minister of Somaliland had banned SNTV from being beamed into households in Somaliland as of June 2019.

== See also ==
- Radio Mogadishu
- Media of Somalia
- Shabelle Media Network
- Somali Broadcasting Corporation
- Somaliland National TV
- Horn Cable Television
- Universal Television (Somalia)
