= Nasrin Mohamed Ibrahim =

Somali journalist

- Born: Nasrin
- Citizenship: Somali
- Occupations: journalist, Television broadcaster
- Employer: Bilan Media

Nasrin Mohamed Ibrahim is a Somali journalist. She established Somalia's first exclusively female media, Bilan Media, where she serves as the editor-in-chief.

== Biography ==
In 2022, she founded Bilan Media, the first Somali media outlet exclusively run and staffed by women. At that time, she partnered with Fatih Mohamed Ahmed. Her goal is to create an organization that focuses on topics usually considered taboo within Somali society, and to amplify the voices of women in a society where they are rarely visible. Moreover, she supports that a female-run news agency allows for a more precise focus on subjects that are less accessible to men. For instance, in cases of rape, it is easier for a woman to interview the victim and gather her testimony than it would be for a man. From that point on, she became one of the few female news producers in the country.

In 2024, she launched the country's first female-led television show dedicated to current affairs, together with the six journalists from the media outlet.
