= Puntland TV and Radio =

Public broadcasting owned by Puntland

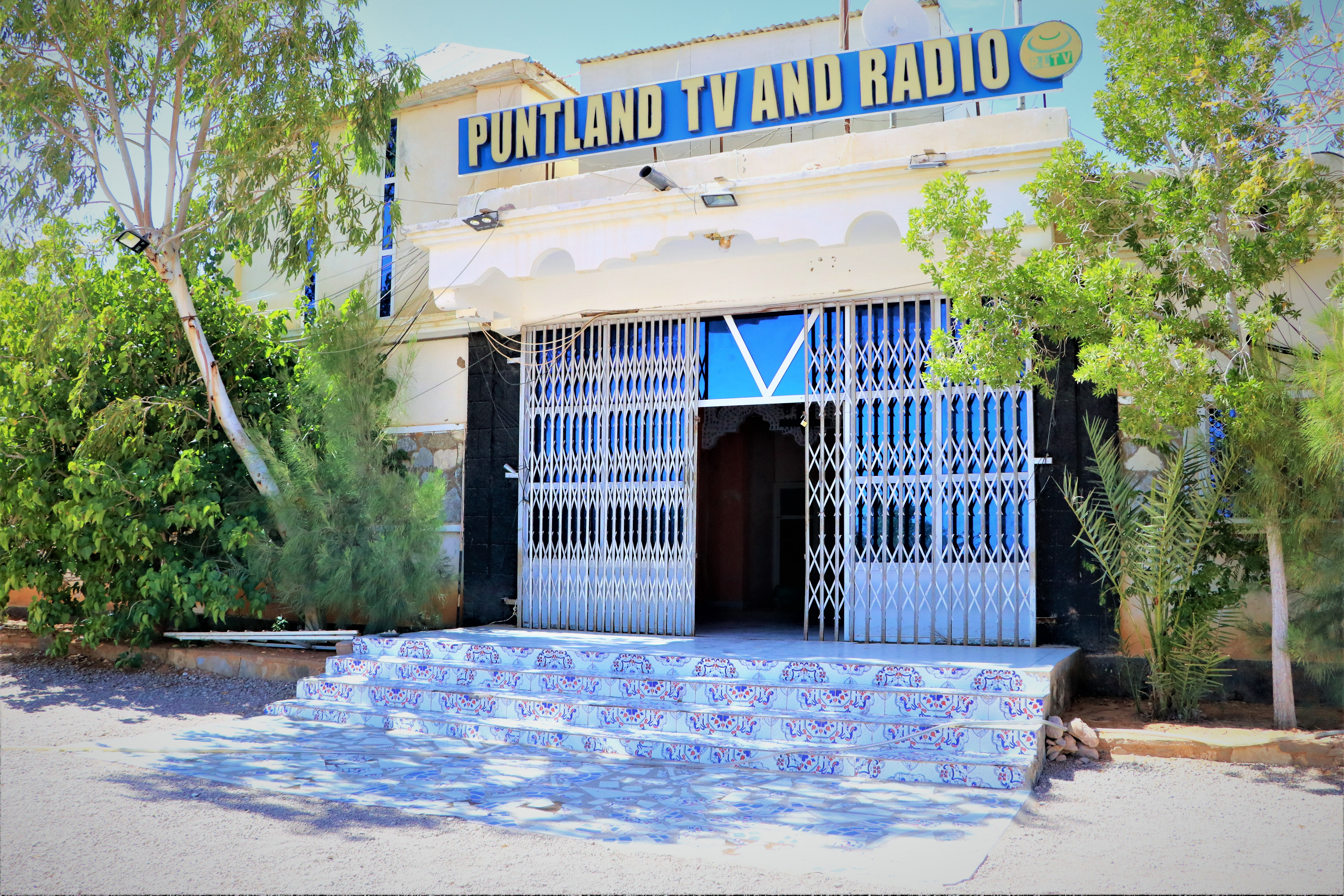
- Type: Public-service radio and television broadcaster
- Country: Puntland
- First air date: April 2013
- Availability: Worldwide
- Founded: Garowe, Puntland
- Headquarters: Garowe, and London
- Owner: Government of Puntland; Ministry of Information, Technology and Tourism
- Key people: Jamal Arab Yusuf, Director
- Launch date: April 2013
- Official website: statetvradio.pl.so

Puntland TV and Radio (PLTV Somali: Raadiyaha iyo Telefishinka Dawladda Puntland) is the public broadcasting network owned by the government of Puntland and overseen by the Ministry of Information. Its headquarters are located in the capital, Garowe. The service also maintains an office in London. Established in April 2013, Puntland Television and Radio broadcasts locally in the Horn of Africa via terrestrial services and airs programmes globally through satellite. Radio Puntland also broadcasts internationally via shortwave, with its transmissions reaching as far as Finland. Its regular programming encompasses global news, regional developments, sporting events, and entertainment.

== History and establishment ==
Puntland TV and Radio broadcasts locally in Somalia via terrestrial services and globally through satellite. Radio Puntland additionally uses shortwave for international broadcasting, reaching as far as Finland.

The network's programming includes general news with a focus on regional developments, sports and entertainment.

The Puntland TV and Radio established during Presidency Farole in April 2013, This media outlet plays a significant role in disseminating information within and about the region.

On August 3, 2014, the President of Puntland, Abdiweli Mohamed Ali Gaas, released a statement followed by a presidential decree appointing Abdifatah Nur Ashkir as the new Director of the Puntland TV and Radio Agency.

On August 12, 2014, the former state media director, Ahmed Mohamed Kismayo, administered the oath of office presented by senior government officials, politicians, traditional leaders, and journalists in the capital, Garowe. Following the inauguration, Ashkir officially took office.

== Directors ==
1. Ahmed Mohamed Kismayo, 2013 – 2014
2. Abdifatah Nur Ashkir, 2014 – 2016
3. Jamal Arab Yusuf, 2016 – 2020
4. Dahir Afloow, ?
5. Abdifatah Nur Ashkir, 2020—

== See also ==
- Horn Cable Television
- Somali National Television
- Universal Television Somalia
- Eastern Television Network ETN TV
