= Mohamoud Sheikh Dalmar =

Somali journalist and Islamic scholar

Mohamoud Sheikh Dalmar محمود الشيخ ضلمر
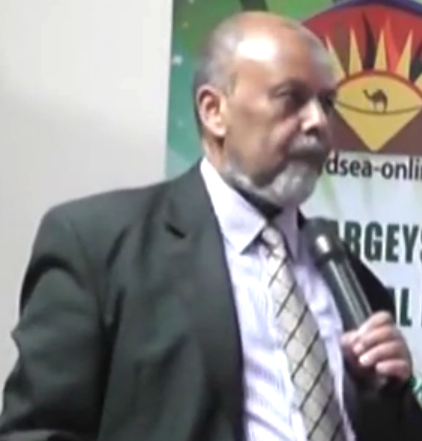
- Born: Somalia
- Occupations: journalist, scholar
- Title: Producer for Horn Cable TV

Sheikh Mohamoud Sheikh Dalmar (Somali: Maxamuud Sheekh Dalmar, Arabic: محمود الشيخ ضلمر) is a Somali journalist and Islamic scholar. He worked for many years with a variety of Somali media outlets as well as the BBC's Somali service. Dalmar presently serves as a radio and television producer in the UK with the private Somali Horn Cable TV network. He is a public intellectual and an authority on Muslim scripture. Additionally, Dalmar is an expert on Somali poetry and Arabic grammar, syntax and calligraphy.

== See also ==
- Abdirahman Yabarow
