= Bilan Media =

Somalian all-women media

- Type: Online newspaper
- Staff writers: 6
- Founded: 2022; 3 years ago
- Language: Somali, English (digital translation)
- Headquarters: Mogadishu
- Country: Somalia
- Website: www.bilan.media

Bilan Media is a Somali media composed exclusively of women. Launched in 2022 and led by Nasrin Mohamed Ibrahim, it is primarily dedicated to social issues affecting Somalia.

== History ==
Somalia is the most dangerous country in Africa for journalists. Bilan Media was founded in April 2022 with the support of the United Nations Development Programme (UNDP) and is composed of a team of six journalists. Shortly before the launch of Bilan Media, one of the group's journalists survived an Islamist attack by the al-Shabaab group. This is the first entirely female-run media outlet in the country, advocating for greater visibility on issues affecting women. The term "bilan" was chosen because it means "bright" in Somali.

Since the establishment of the organization, the editor-in-chief has been Fathi Mohamed Ahmed, and the director is Nasrin Mohamed Ibrahim. Since its inception, the media outlet has focused on social issues, including sharing news about period poverty in Somalia and interviewing women and girls. It also addresses traditionally taboo subjects, such as drug use among disadvantaged people in Somalia. The content is distributed via radio, television, and online print media.

In 2024, the group launched the first Somali political television show organized by women. In June of the same year, it won the One World Media Press Freedom Award.
