= Mareeg newspaper =

Media in Somalia

Mareeg Media
- Type: Daily newspaper
- Owner: Abdullahi ali warsame
- Editor-in-chief: Ahmed Wehlie AKA Ahmed Gaashaan
- Founded: 2019
- Relaunched: 2019
- Language: English, Somali
- Headquarters: Mogadishu
- City: Mogadishu
- Country: Somalia
- Website: mareeg.com

The Mareeg Newspaper (Somali: Wargeyska mareeg) is an independent newspaper based in Mogadishu, the capital city of Somalia. Founded in 2019, it provides domestic news both in Somali and English. The outlet is part of the larger Mareeg Media that is headquartered in the city. Mareeg Newspaper is published 6 days in the week.
