= Radio Garowe =

Radio station based in Garowe, Puntland

- Industry: Broadcasting
- Founded: 2004
- Headquarters: Garowe, Somalia
- Key people: Ahmed Awil Jama (Director)
- Divisions: Garowe, Bosaso

Radio Garowe is a radio station based in Garowe, the administrative capital of the autonomous Puntland region in northeastern Somalia. Established in 2004, the broadcaster transmits programs daily on 89.8 FM. In May 2013, Radio Garowe launched an additional FM station in Bosaso.

== See also ==
- Garowe Online
- Radio Mogadishu
- Radio Gaalkacyo
- Radio Kulmis
- Radio Laascaanood
- Media of Somalia
