= Radio Mogadishu =

Radio station in Somalia

- Type: Broadcast
- Country: Somalia
- First air date: 1951
- Availability: National
- Headquarters: Mogadishu, Somalia
- Owner: Federal Government of Somalia Director: Abdiaziz Afrika
- Launch date: 1951
- Official website: Radio Muqdisho
- Language: Somali, Arabic, English, Italian

Radio Mogadishu (Somali: Radio Muqdisho, Arabic: راديو مقديشو) is the federal government-run radio station of Somalia.

== History ==
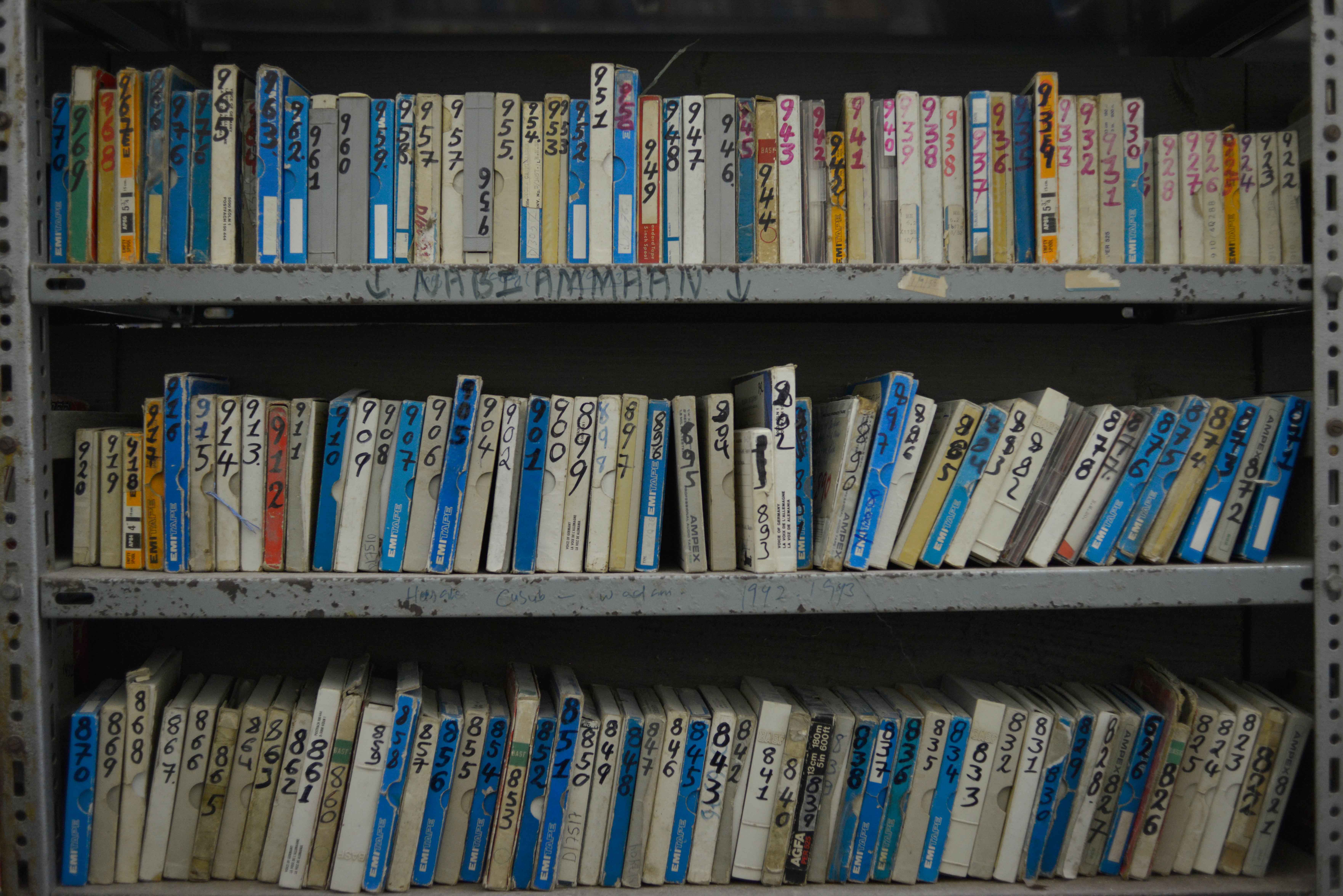
Analog reels at Radio Mogadishu headquarters.

Established in 1951 during the period of the Italian run UN Trust Territory of Somaliland, Radio Mogadishu initially broadcast news items in both Somali and Italian. Radio Mogadishu was modernized with Russian assistance following independence in 1960, and began offering home service in Somali, Amharic and Oromo.

The station was a focal point in rising political tensions between UNOSOM II and the Somali National Alliance during mid-1993. It was the site of the 5 June 1993 clash that resulted in the initiation of a UNOSOM military offensive and emergence of an anti-US/UN insurgency in Mogadishu.

After closing down operations due to the civil war that broke out in 1991, the station was officially re-opened in 23 August 2001 by the Transitional National Government of former President of Somalia Abdiqasim Salad Hassan.

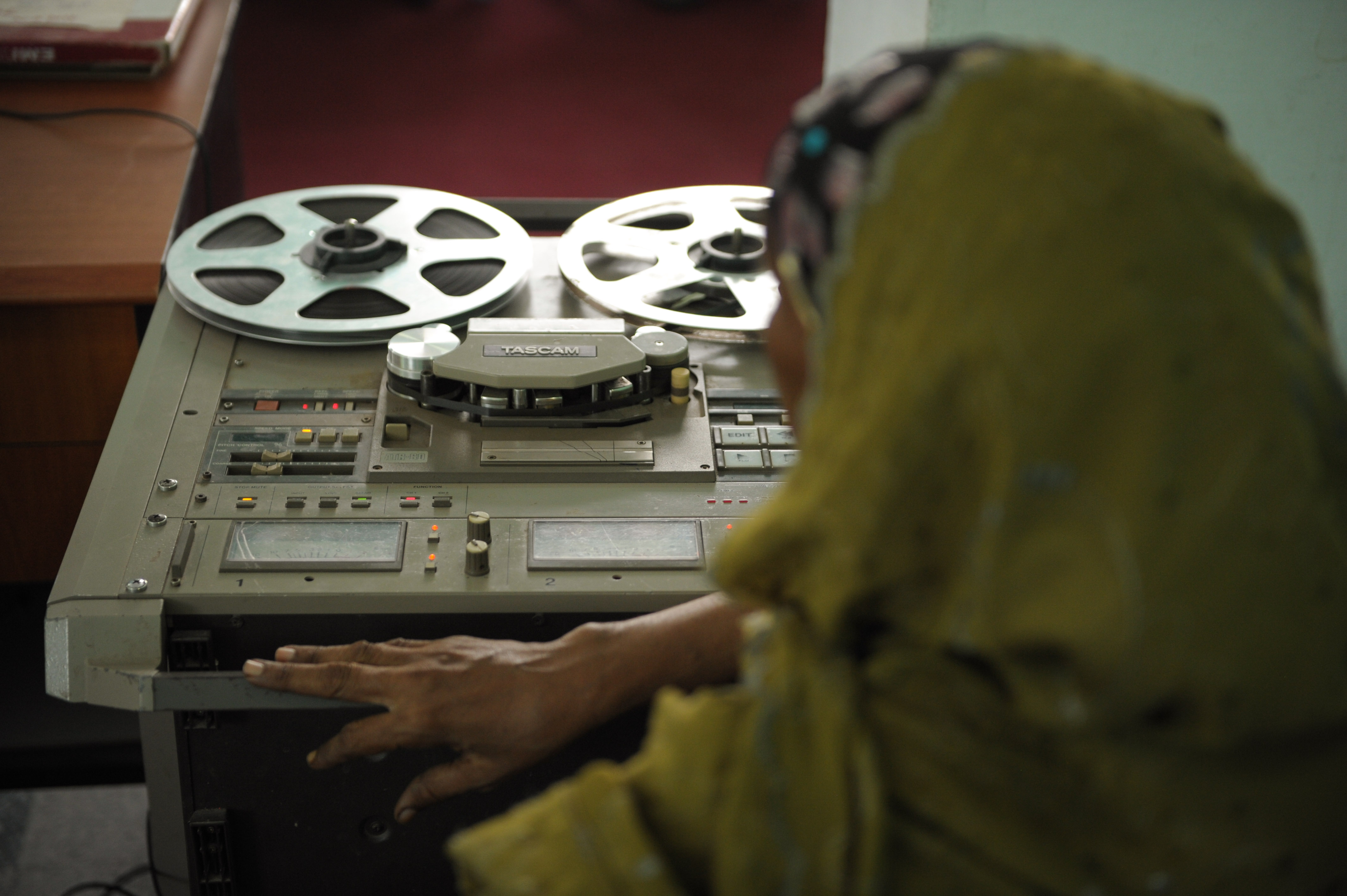
Radio Mogadishu analog-to-digital machine.

Prior to the Somali Army's ultimate pacification of the capital in August 2011, Radio Mogadishu operated from a walled compound guarded by armed soldiers. The station's staff routinely broadcast news, talk shows and music despite threats of violence.

Radio Mogadishu presently broadcasts from downtown Mogadishu. In the late 2000s, the station also launched a complementary website of the same name, with news items in Somali, Arabic and English. In 2013 Radio Mogadishu started the process of digitization of its archives, which dates back from 1951.

== Staff ==
Current

- Abdiaziz M Guled Afrika, director
- Abdilahi Qorshe, Chief Editor
- Mohamed Kaafi Sheikh Abukar Editor of Planning

Former

- Mohamed Abshir Waldo, director
- Sheik Nur Mohamed Abkey, reporter

== See also ==
- Media of Somalia
- Radio Garowe
- Radio Gaalkacyo
- Shabelle Media Network
- Somali National Television
