= Garowe Online =

Bilingual news website

- Available in: Somali, English
- Founded: 2004
- Headquarters: Garowe, {{{location_country}}}
- Owner: Garowe News Group
- Website: garoweonline.com

Garowe Online is an independent bilingual news website founded in 2004 and is owned by Garowe News Group, which also owns Radio Garowe. The organisation is based in Garowe, the capital of Puntland State of Somalia. In 2011, Garowe Online was one of the most popular websites in Puntland, accessed daily by the Puntland political elite.

== Creation ==
Garowe Online was established in 2004 and associated with Radio Garowe.

== News profile ==
The site mainly provides news about Somalia, the Horn of Africa, Africa as a whole, and, once in a while, from around the world. It mainly focuses on security, politics and humanitarian affairs.

== Quality ==
In 2011, the BBC described Garowe Online as providing "particularly good context to stories", providing details for the main facts in stories, in contrast to other Somali news sources, The BBC found that Garowe Online had one of the best examples of investigative reporting.

== Audience ==
In 2011, Garowe Online was one of the most popular websites in Puntland, and was an elite news source there, "accessed online every morning by ministers and officials", according to a BBC analysis.

As of 2013, Somalia didn't have many significant newspapers outside of Somaliland, owing to its decades of conflict. Garowe Online is among the main sources of news for the public in Somalia as well as the diaspora. The website publishes news in both the Somali language and English.

== Developers ==
- Jayendra Narayan Singh
- Sachin Sharma
