= Universal Television (Somalia) =

Somali television channel

Universal Television is a Somali television channel. Established in 2005 with its studio in Kuala Lumpur, Malaysia, and London, England, United Kingdom, it is the first and largest Somali TV satellite network of its type.

The Somaliland police shut down and raided its headquarters in Hargeisa on 27 June 2020 after being accused of broadcasting coverage of celebrations of the anniversary of the independence of Somalia rather than Somaliland. The channel's crew was jailed. On 1 July, the Committee to Protect Journalists demanded the removal of securities in its offices, as well as the resumption of its broadcasts.

Somaliland authorities revoked its license on 12 February 2025 due to violations on the status of the territory.

== See also ==
- Media of Somalia
- Somali National Television
- Shabelle Media Network
- Somali Broadcasting Corporation
- Somaliland National TV
- Horn Cable Television
