= Puntland =

Federal State in Somalia

Puntland: Buntilaan (Somali); أرض البنط (Arabic)
- Puntland State of Somalia
- Flag Coat of arms

- Established: 1 August 1998
- Capital: Garowe

Government
  - Type: Semi-autonomous parliamentary republic with an executive presidency
  - Body: Government of Puntland
  - President: Said Abdullahi Deni
  - Vice-President: Ilyas Osman Lugator
  - House Speaker: Abdirizak Ahmed Said

Area
  - Total: 212,510 km^{2} (82,050 sq mi)
  - Water: 21,711 km^{2} (8,383 sq mi)

Population
  - Estimate (2016): 4,334,633
- Demonym: Puntlander
- Time zone: UTC+3 (EAT)
  - Summer (DST): UTC+3
- Area code: +25290 (Somalia)
- ISO 3166 code: SO

Puntland, (Note: Somali: Buntilaan, Arabic: أرض البنط, romanized: Wilāyat Arḍ al-Bunṭ aṣ-Ṣūmāliyyah) officially the Puntland State of Somalia, (Note: Somali: Dawladda Puntland ee Soomaaliya, Arabic: ولاية أرض البنط الصومالية) is a semi-autonomous state located in northeastern Somalia. Despite considering itself as part of Somalia, it has rejected the legitimacy of Somalia's current governing administration since 2024. It was formed in 1998, and is a federal member state of Somalia. Its capital is the city of Garoowe in the Nugal region. The region had a population of 4,334,633 in 2016.

Puntland is bordered by Somaliland to its west, the Gulf of Aden in the north, the Guardafui Channel in the northeast, the Indian Ocean to the east, Galmudug State in the south, and Ethiopia in the southwest. There are several major geographical apexes in Puntland, including the Cape Guardafui, which forms the tip of the Horn of Africa, Ras Hafun, the easternmost place on the entire African continent, and the beginning of the Karkaar mountain range.

The name "Puntland" is derived from the Land of Punt mentioned in ancient Egyptian sources, although the exact location of the ancient territory is still unknown. Many studies suggest that the Land of Punt was located in present-day Somalia, whereas others propose that it was situated elsewhere.

On 31 March 2024, following changes due to the constitutional crisis in Somalia, the government of Puntland stated that it no longer recognizes the authority of the central federal government in Somalia and would no longer participate in Somali federal institutions. It has declared that it will "act independently", or "exercise powers of an independent state", until there is a federal government with a constitution agreed upon in a referendum in which Puntland participates.

== History ==
=== Majeerteen and Hobyo Sultanates ===
The Majeerteen Sultanate (Migiurtinia) was founded in the mid-18th century. It rose to prominence the following century, under the reign of the resourceful Boqor (King) Osman Mahamuud. Centred in Alula, it controlled much of northern and central Somalia in the 19th and early 20th centuries. Boqor Osman was one of the prominent Darood clan chiefs who ruled the ancient towns of Alula, Bargaal, Bosaso and Hafun and subsequently emerged as a powerful traditional elder who fully controlled areas under his rule. The polity maintained a robust trading network, entered into treaties with foreign powers, and exerted strong centralized authority on the domestic front.

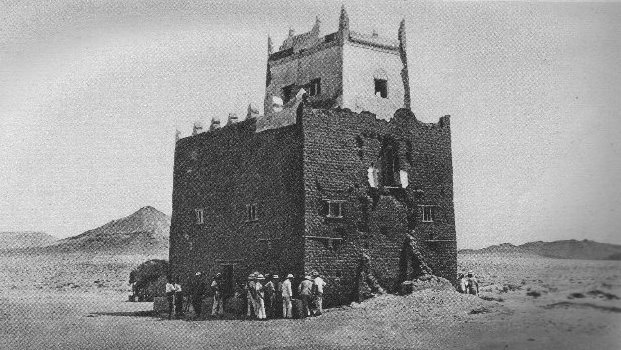
One of the forts of the Majeerteen Sultanate (Migiurtinia) in Hafun

The Majeerteen Sultanate was nearly destroyed in the mid-1800s by a power struggle between Boqor Osman and his ambitious cousin, Yusuf Ali Kenadid. After almost five years of battle, the young upstart was finally forced into exile in Yemen. A decade later, in the 1870s, Kenadid returned from the Arabian Peninsula with a band of Hadhrami musketeers and a group of devoted lieutenants. With their assistance, he managed to overpower the local clans and establish the Sultanate of Hobyo in 1878.

In late 1889, Boqor Osman entered into a treaty with Italy, making his realm an Italian protectorate. His rival Sultan Kenadid had signed a similar agreement vis-a-vis his own Sultanate the year before. Both rulers had signed the protectorate treaties to advance their own expansionist objectives, with Boqor Osman looking to use Italy's support in his ongoing power struggle with Kenadid over the Majeerteen Sultanate. Boqor Osman and Sultan Kenadid also hoped to exploit the conflicting interests among the European imperial powers that were then looking to control the Somali peninsula, so as to avoid direct occupation of their territories by force.

With the gradual extension into northern Somalia of European colonial rule, all three sultanates were annexed to Italian Somaliland in the early 20th century.

=== Establishment of Puntland ===
Following the outbreak of the Somali Civil War in 1991, a home-grown constitutional conference was held in Garoowe in 1998 over a period of three months. Attended by the area's political elite, traditional elders (Issims), members of the business community, intellectuals and other civil society representatives, the autonomous Puntland State of Somalia was established to deliver services to the population, offer security, facilitate trade, and interact with domestic and international partners. Abdullahi Yusuf Ahmed served as the fledgling state's founding president.

As stipulated in Article 1 of the Transitional Federal Charter of the Somali Republic, Puntland is a part of the Federal State of Somalia. As such, the region seeks the unity of Somalis and adheres to a federal system of government. Unlike the republic of Somaliland to its west, Puntland is not trying to obtain international recognition as a separate nation. However, both regions have one thing in common: they base their support upon clan elders and their organizational structure along lines based on clan relationships and kinship. However, a key difference was that Puntland was formed as a descendant-based entity unlike in Somaliland. The state was established as a "homeland" for the Harti community of Northern Somalia, whereby the Majeerten were deemed as the "chief architects" of the entity. Since its establishment in 1998, Puntland has also been in territorial disputes with Somaliland over the Sool, Sanaag and Ayn regions.

The legal structure of Puntland consists of the judiciary, legislative (House of Representatives) and the executive (the President and his nominated Council of Ministries) branches of government. Though relatively peaceful, the region briefly experienced political unrest in 2001 when then President of Puntland, Abdullahi Yusuf Ahmed, one of the founding fathers of the Puntland State and its first president, wanted his term extended. Ahmed and Jama Ali Jama fought for control of the region, with Ahmed emerging victorious the following year. Ahmed served his second term as president until October 2004, when he was elected President of Somalia. He was succeeded in office by Mohamed Hashi, who served until January 2005 when he lost a re-election bid in parliament to General Mohamud Muse Hersi "Adde".

== Politics ==
Puntland uses a parliamentary system in which the president and the vice president are elected by the unicameral Parliament of Puntland.

=== General Adde Muse administration ===
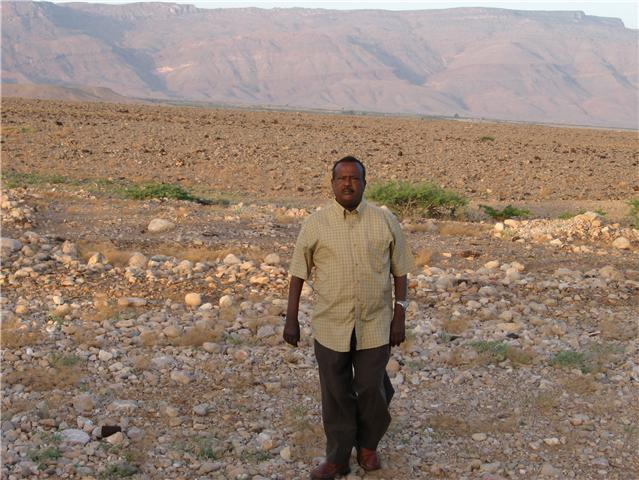
Mohamud Muse Hersi

In March 2005, President Muse began a plan to build the Bender Qassim International Airport in Puntland's commercial capital of Bosaso.

In April 2007, Muse held meetings with Sheikh Saud bin Saqr Al Qasimi, the crown prince and deputy ruler of Ras al-Khaimah in the United Arab Emirates (UAE), where the two leaders signed an agreement on a deal for setting up of a dedicated livestock quarantine facility to facilitate the import of livestock from Somalia to the UAE. In October 2008, Muse also signed a Dh170 million agreement with Dubai's Lootah Group to support the construction of an airport, seaport and free zone in the coastal city of Bosaso. Muse indicated that "I believe that when we finish all these projects our people will benefit by getting good health services, education and overall prosperity."

=== Farole administration ===
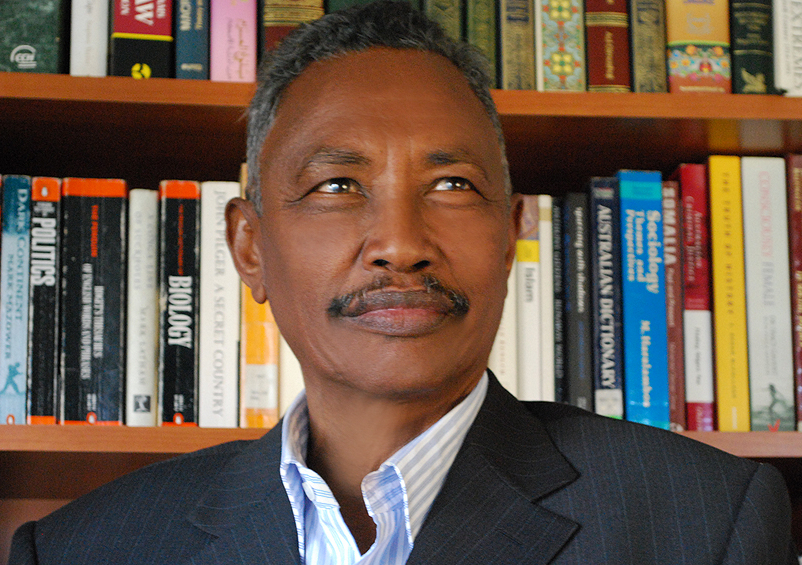
Abdirahman Farole

In January 2009, Abdirahman Farole was elected the new president of Puntland. Upon assuming office, the Farole administration implemented a number of reforms, particularly in the security and judicial sectors. To bolster the region's justice system, numerous new prosecutors, judges and other court personnel as well as additional prison guards were hired and trained. In July 2010, the Puntland Council of Ministers unanimously approved a new anti-terrorism law to more efficiently handle terror suspects and their accomplices; a special court is also expected to be established within the region's existing criminal courts system to facilitate the task.

Fiscally, a transparent, budget-based public finance system was established, which has reportedly helped increase public confidence in government. In addition, a new regional constitution was drafted and later passed on 15 June 2009, which is believed to represent a significant step toward the eventual introduction of a multi-party political system to the region for the first time; such a system already exists in the adjacent Somaliland region.

More modest reforms were also put into motion in the social sector, particularly in the education and healthcare fields. The regional government has hired more healthcare workers and teachers, with major plans under way for school and hospital renovations. One of the most significant new reforms enacted by the incumbent Puntland administration is the launching in May 2009 of the Puntland Agency For Social Welfare (PASWE), the first organization of its kind in Somali history. The agency provides medical, educational and counselling support to vulnerable groups and individuals such as orphans, the disabled and the blind. PASWE is overseen by a Board of Directors, which consists of religious scholars (ulema), business people, intellectuals and traditional elders.

=== Democratization process ===
On 15 June 2009, the Puntland government passed a new regional draft constitution, representing a significant step toward the eventual introduction of a multi-party political system to the region for the first time.

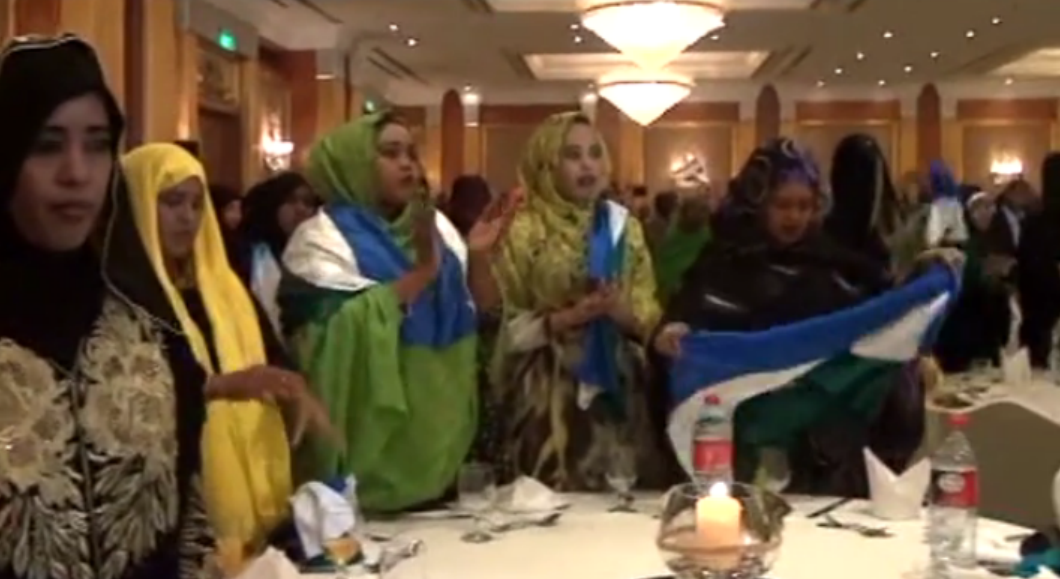
Women at a political function during the Puntland democratisation process

On 15 April 2012, the Puntland government opened a four-day constitutional convention officially inaugurating the new Constitution of Puntland. Overseen by the Puntland Electoral Commission (PEC), the constitution represented the final step in the extant regional democratization process and was scheduled to be followed by the formation of political parties.

On 12 September 2012, the Puntland Electoral Commission announced that the registration process for political parties in Puntland was now open. This came after the passing of the Political Association Law, the Referendum Act, the District Elections Law and the inauguration of the state constitution. They will also be challengers in the next elections, scheduled for January 2014.

On 14 November 2012, President Farole announced the launching of his new political party, Horseed. The association counts over 200 members and represents the incumbent Puntland government, including Vice President Abdisamad Ali Shire and the state Ministers. It is the first prospective party to register for an application with the Transitional Puntland Electoral Commission (TPEC). According to Farole, the general public will be eligible for membership in the organization once it is selected as an official political party. Five other political associations were established the following month, including the Development and Justice Party Horcad launched by an entrepreneur and businessman Omar Ismail Waberi along other politicians, the Union of the People of the Regions or UPR (Ururka Gobolada Umadaha Bahoobey or UGUB), Midnimo, Talowadaag (Consensus-building), and GAHAYR or Golaha Aqoonta iyo Horumarinta ee Asaaska Yoolka Runta (Council of Education and Development towards Founding the True Goal).

=== Dr. Abdiweli Mohamed Ali Gaas administration ===
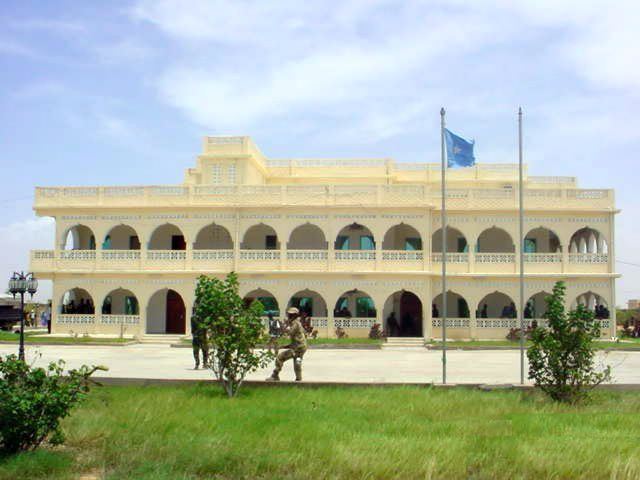
Presidential residence in Bosaso

On 8 January 2014, former Prime Minister of Somalia Abdiweli Mohamed Ali was elected as the 5th President of Puntland overcoming Dr. Farole by a single electoral vote. Abdihakim Abdullahi Haji Omar was concurrently elected Puntland's vice president.

=== Deni administration ===
On 8 January 2019 the former Federal Minister for Planning and International Cooperation, Said Abdullahi Deni, was declared the new president. The election was closely contested, going to a third round of voting. Deni defeated former intelligence officer, Asad Osman Abdullahi. Deni got 35 votes, to Diayno's 31 votes.

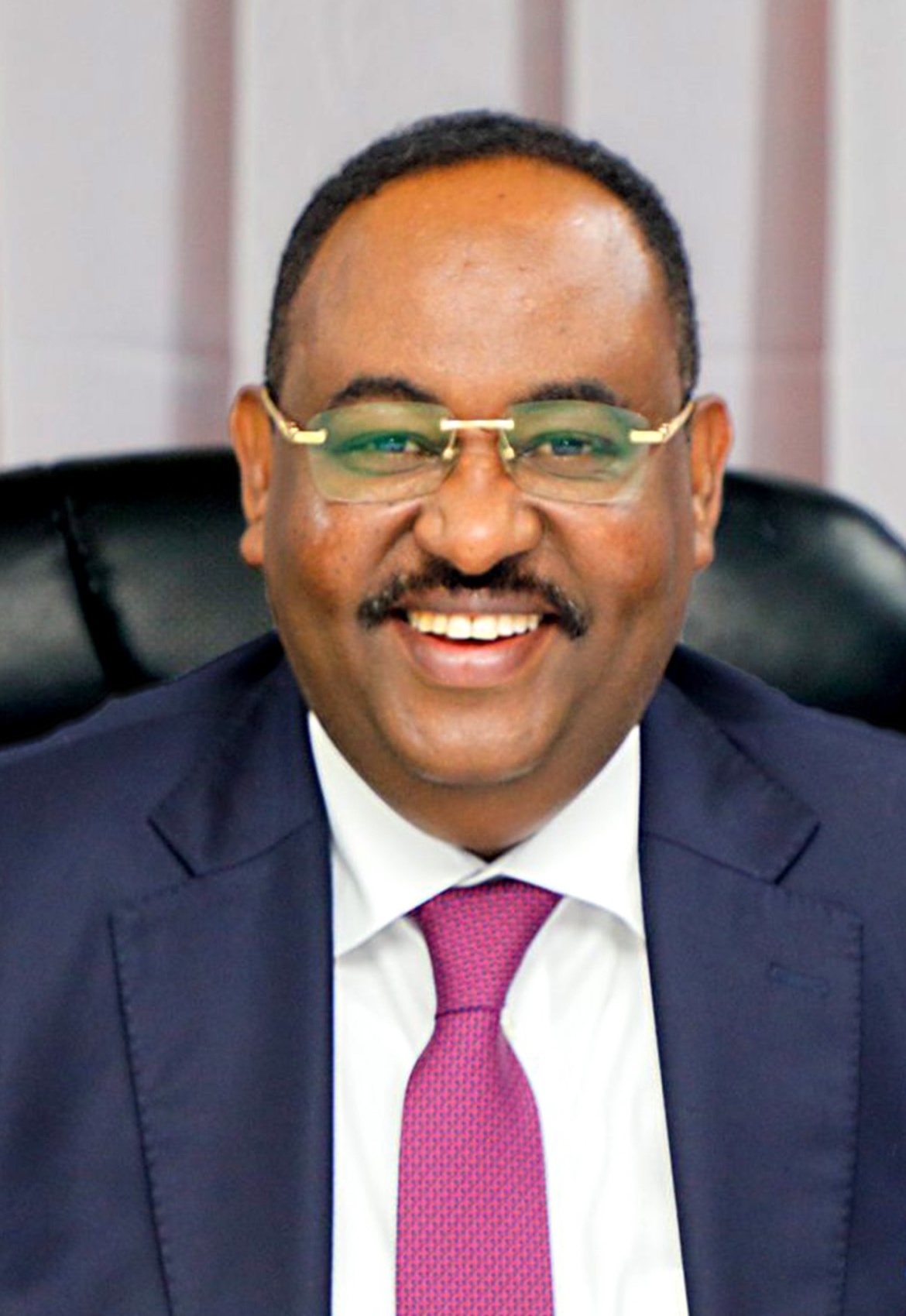
President of Puntland Said Abdullahi Deni

Deni addressed the lawmakers after being declared the winner. He said he would continue the policies of his predecessor, Abdiweli Gaas. In April 2024, Puntland announced it would operate as an independent state amid a dispute over Somali constitutional changes.

== Administrative divisions ==
=== Regions ===
As stipulated in Article 3 of the Transitional Constitution of the Puntland Regional Government of 2001, Puntland consists of the following claimed regions:

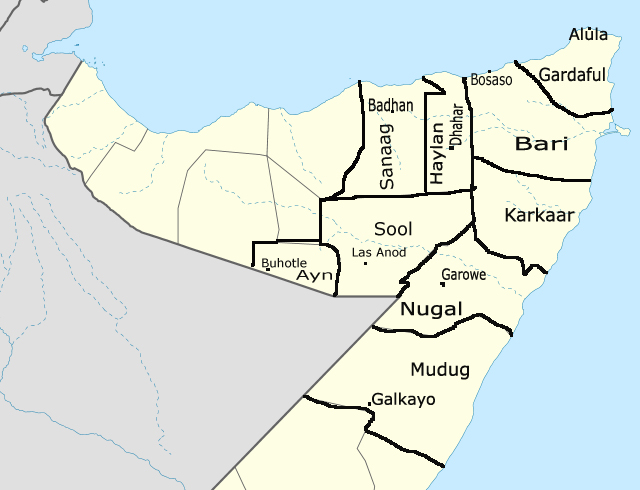
Puntland	Regions	Capitals	Districts
	Ayn	Buuhoodle	3
	Bari	Bosaso	5
	Karkaar	Qardho	5
	Ra'as Aseir	Aluula	5
	Haylaan	Dhahar	3
	Mudug	Galkayo	2,5
	Nugal	Garowe	5
	Sanaag	Badhan	4
	Sool	Las Anod	7

=== Redistricting and border disputes ===
In January 2009, the short-lived quasi-state of Maakhir was officially incorporated into Puntland.

Control of the western Sool, Sanaag and Ayn (SSC) provinces is disputed with Somaliland. On 17 July 2025, the Puntland government reaffirmed that these regions remained under its governance, refusing to recognize the Khatumo administration until a consultative agreement can be reached.

On 8 April 2013, the Puntland government announced the creation of a new region named Gardafuul. Carved out of the Bari region, it consists of three districts and has its capital at Aluula. Prior to naming this new region, the previous government of Puntland created three regions, all carved out of the existing regions: Karkaar was carved out of Bari, Haylaan out of Sanaag, and Ayn out of Togdheer region.

In the south, according to the federal government of Somalia and CIA, the southern part of Mudug is part of Galmudug.

Largest cities or towns in Puntland
Rank	Name	Region	Pop.
1	Bosaso	Bari, Somalia	164,906
2	Galkayo	Mudug	137,667
3	Garoowe	Nugaal	70,991
4	Qardho	Bari, Somalia	56,825
5	Badhan, Sanaag	Puntland–Somaliland dispute	55,300
6	Galdogob	Nugaal	40,433
7	Waiye	Bari, Somalia	44,109
8	n/a	n/a	n/a
9	n/a	n/a	n/a
10	n/a	n/a	n/a

== Geography ==
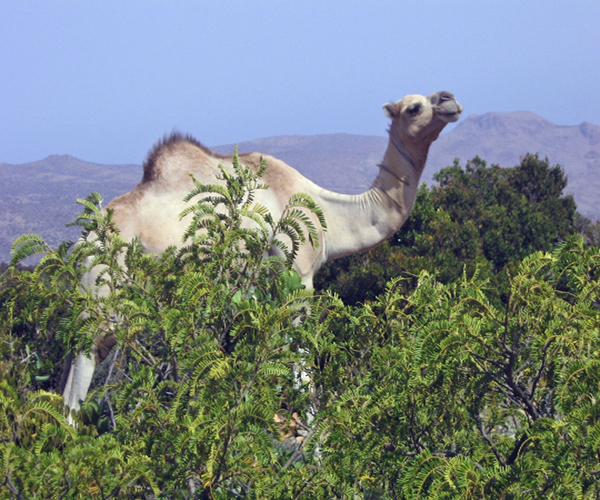
A dromedary in Puntland's Cal Madow mountain range

Puntland is geographically situated in the northeastern portion of Somalia. It is bordered by Somaliland to its west, the Gulf of Aden in the north, the Indian Ocean in the southeast, and Ethiopia in the southwest. Puntland occupies a total land area of 212,510 km^{2} (82,050 sq mi) or roughly one-third of Somalia's geographical area. Mountains include Golis Mountains, Galgala, and Al Madow.

=== Climate ===
The region is semi-arid, with a warm climate and average daily temperatures ranging from 27 °C (80.6 °F) to 37 °C (98.6 °F). These climatic conditions favor pastoralism as the most effective use of land in most parts of the region. Grazing lands include the Hawd region in the high plateau to the west of the Mudug and Sool regions, into the lush green land of Sanaag and into Ethiopia and the low Nugaal valley. Mild temperatures, by contrast, are experienced only along the high mountain ranges of Bari.

Rainfall is sparse and variable, with no single area receiving more than 400 mm (15.7 in) of rain annually. Nomads primarily rely on wells as a source of water rather than surface water. There are four main seasons around which pastoral and agricultural life revolve, and these are dictated by shifts in the wind patterns. Puntland's seasons are:

- Jilal – from January to March; the harshest dry season of the year
- Gu – from April to June; the main rainy season
- Xagaa – from July to September; the second dry season
- Deyr – from October to December; the shorter and less reliable rainy season

== Education ==
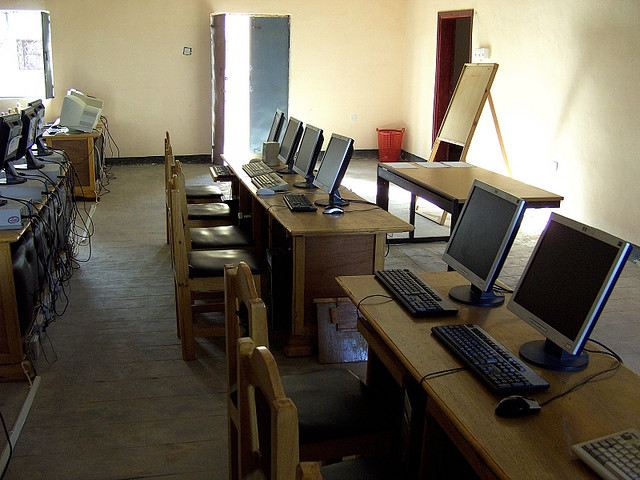
A computer classroom in Puntland State University's Garowe campus

Following the outbreak of the civil war in Somalia, numerous problems arose with regard to access to education in rural areas and along gender lines, quality of educational provisions, responsiveness of school curricula, educational standards and controls, management and planning capacity, and financing. To address these concerns, the Puntland government is in the process of developing an educational policy to guide the region's scholastic process as it embarks on the path of reconstruction and economic development. The latter includes a gender sensitive national education policy compliant with world standards, such as those outlined in the Convention on the Rights of the Child (CRC) and the Convention on the Elimination of All Forms of Discrimination against Women (CEDAW). Examples of this and other educational measures at work are the government's enactment of legislation aimed at securing the educational interests of girls, promoting the growth of an Early Childhood Development (ECD) program designed to reach parents and care-givers in their homes as well as in the ECD centers for 0- to 5-year-old children, and introducing incentive packages to encourage teachers to work in remote rural areas. Puntland's education system is considered the most progressive, and is attempting to close the gender gap so that more females will be able to attend school. Other regions are following Puntland's lead in that regard.

Within the Puntland government, the Ministry of Education is responsible for developing and managing the region's educational needs. It is headed by the Minister Mohamud Bile Dubbe, under whom a Vice Minister and Director General help oversee a Post-Primary Education Division (PPED) and a Basic Education Directorate (BED), among other boards.

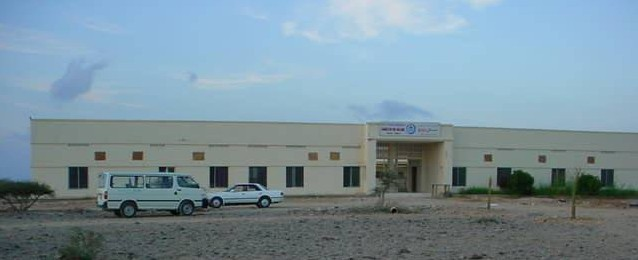
Entrance to East Africa University's Bosaso campus

The educational system of Puntland comprises two years of Early Childhood Development (ECD), eight years of primary education (four years of lower primary and four years of upper primary) and four years of secondary education. Tertiary education comprises an average of four years, with the region currently counting seven major universities: Puntland State University in Garowe, Puntland State University in Galkayo, Bosaso College in Bosaso, East Somalia University in Qardho, Mogadishu University (Puntland branch) in Bosaso, Maakhir University in Badhan, Sanaag, and Nugaal University in Las Anod. East Africa University also has six branches in Puntland, with campuses in Bosaso, Erigavo, Galdogob, Galkayo, Garowe and Qardho. Thus, it is a 2-4-4-4 system. Puntland's Ministry of Education also recognizes non-formal education (NFE) and technical/vocational education and training (TVET) as integral parts of the region's educational system.

From 2005/2006 to 2006/2007, there was a significant increase in the number of schools in Puntland, up 137 institutions from just one year prior. During the same period, the number of classes in the region increased by 504, with 762 more teachers also offering their services. Total student enrollment increased by 27% over the previous year, with girls lagging only slightly behind boys in attendance in most regions. The highest class enrollment was observed in the northernmost Bari region, and the lowest was observed in the under-populated Ayn region. The distribution of classrooms was almost evenly split between urban and rural areas, with marginally more pupils attending and instructors teaching classes in urban areas.

Following the COVID-19 crisis, the Government of Puntland launched the Learning Passport, a digital remote learning platform where children can access educational content both online and offline from their homes. The Learning Passport is a ground-breaking partnership between UNICEF, Microsoft and the University of Cambridge.

== Demographics and religion ==
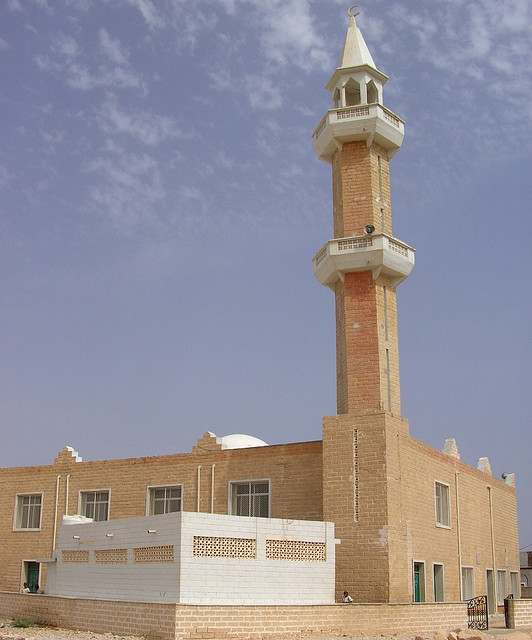
A mosque in Bosaso

As of 2016, the population of Puntland is estimated at 4,334,633 residents, 39% of whom are nomads. The region is primarily inhabited by people from the Somali ethnic group, with the Darod especially well-represented. There are also a number of Mehri residents.

Currently, 31% of the region's residents live in the fast-growing towns of Bosaso, Gardo, Las Anod, Buuhoodle, Badhan, Galdogob, Garowe and Galkayo. Approximately 70% of the population is also below the age of 30.

The population density in Puntland is estimated at 20/km^{2} (52/sq mi).

As with the rest of Somalia, Islam is the main religion of the Puntland region.

== Transport ==
Municipal bus services operate in Bosaso, Garowe, Las Anod, Galkayo and Qardho. Shuttle services between the region's major towns and adjacent hamlets are also available via different types of vehicles, such as 4 wheel drives and light goods vehicles (LGV). As of May 2015, over 70,000 vehicles are registered with the Puntland Ministry of Works and Transport.

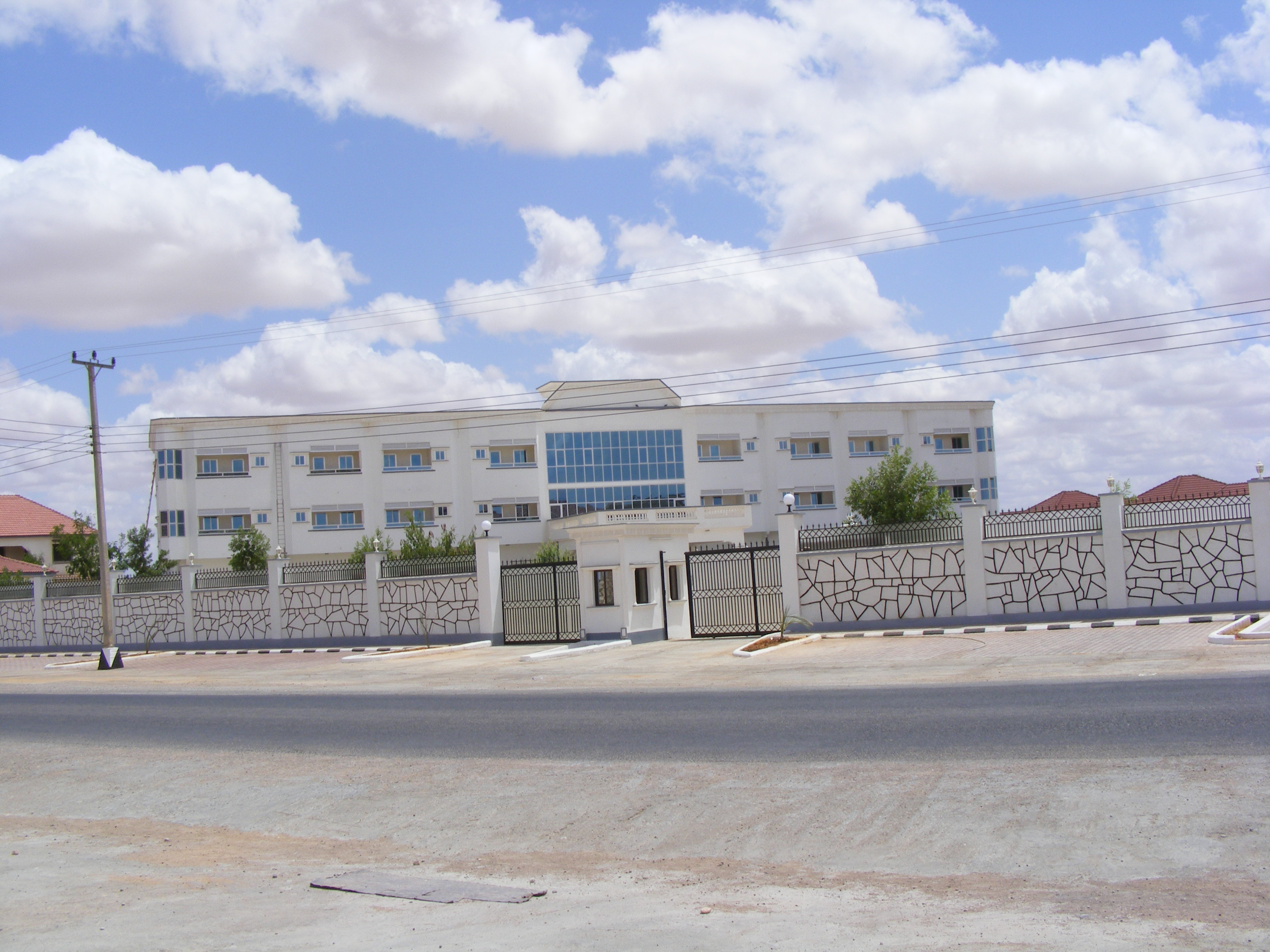
Roadside view of a neighbourhood in Garowe

Puntland is traversed by a 750 km (470 mi) north–south highway. It connects major cities in the northern part of Somalia, such as Garowe, Bosaso and Galkayo, with towns in the south. In 2012, the Puntland Highway Authority completed rehabilitation work on the central artery linking Garowe with Galkayo. The transportation body also started an upgrade and repair project in June 2012 on the large thoroughfare between the regional capital and Bosaso. Additionally, renovations began in October 2012 on the freeway linking Bosaso with Qardho. Plans are also in the works to construct new roads connecting littoral towns in the region to the main highway.

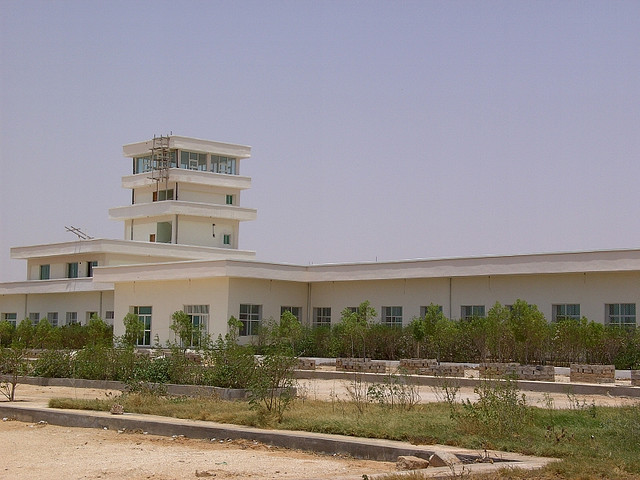
The Bender Qassim International Airport in Bosaso in 2016, prior to renovations

Bosaso has a major seaport, which was constructed during the mid-1980s for annual livestock shipments to the Middle East. In January 2012, a renovation project was launched, with KMC contracted to upgrade the harbor. The initiative's first phase saw the clean-up of unwanted materials from the dockyard and was completed within the month. The second phase involves the reconstruction of the port's adjoining seabed, with the objective of accommodating larger ships. In 2012, a team of engineers was also enlisted by the Puntland authorities to assess the ongoing renovations taking place at the Las Khorey port. According to the Minister of Ports, Said Mohamed Rage, the Puntland government intends to launch more such development projects in Las Khorey.

Local airlines offer flights to various domestic and international locations, such as Djibouti, Addis Ababa, Dubai and Jeddah; they also provide flights for the Hajj and Umrah pilgrimages. The most prominent airlines in Puntland are Jubba Airways, Osob Air and Daallo Airlines, which operate from Bender Qassim International Airport in Bosaso and Abdullahi Yusuf International Airport (formerly Galkayo Airport) in Galkayo, among other places. In late September 2013, a launching ceremony of a tender process for the Bosaso airport's renovations was held at the facility. The renovations will include the extension of the airport's gravel runway from 1,800 m to 2,650 m. The runway's width will also be widened from 30 m to 45 m, and feature 7.5 m gravel shoulders on both sides. According to Puntland Deputy Minister of Civil Aviation Abdiqani Gelle, the Puntland government plans to carry out similar upgrades at the Garowe International Airport in Garowe, the Abdullahi Yusuf International Airport in Galkayo, and the Qardho Airport in Qardho.

== Military ==
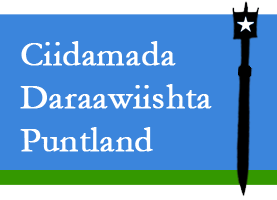
Logo of the Puntland Dervish Force

The Puntland Security Force (PSF) is the armed force of the autonomous Puntland region. Commanders and senior officials of the military are appointed by a qualified panel approved by the Council of Ministers. The Puntland security apparatus also has an independent military judiciary.

The PSF includes the Puntland Dervish Force (PDF), its official paramilitary division. It operates its own police force, which includes a Special Protection Unit.

The Puntland Intelligence Agency (PIA) is the intelligence bureau of Puntland's military. It was established in 2001 as the Puntland Intelligence Service during the rule of President Abdullahi Yusuf Ahmed, with help from the United States.

The Puntland Maritime Police Force (PMPF) is a locally recruited, professional maritime security force. It is primarily aimed at preventing, detecting and eradicating piracy, illegal fishing, and other illicit activity off of the coast of Somalia, and at generally safeguarding the nation's marine resources. In addition, the Force provides civic support, including repairing wells, rehabilitating hospitals and clinics, and refurbishing roads, airports and other infrastructure. It also offers skills training programs to local communities.

== Economy ==
Puntland has 1,600 km (990 mi) of coastline, which is abundant with fish and other natural marine resources. Additional economic products and activities of the region include livestock, frankincense, myrrh, gum arabic, manufacturing and agriculture. Agricultural products such as mangoes, bananas, guavas, lemons, sugarcanes, and peanuts are grown on plantations around the state.

Food items and consumer goods imported via Berbera, Somaliland sell more cheaply compared to those imported via Bosaso. Therefore, in exchange live animals originating from Puntland are exported via Berbera. The key trading centres in Puntland are centred in Bosaso and Galkayo. However, other towns such as Qardho and Garowe act as second-grade market places.

Income is generated through the following industries: livestock, fishery, frankincense, and petty trading. Animals originating from Puntland are exported via Bosaso. The key trading centres in Puntland are centred in Bosaso and Galkayo. Milk collectors ( aanoley in Somali ) are based in markets in the cities of Qardho, Garowe and Boosaso.

Puntland has the lowest rate of poverty in Somalia, with 27%, compared to 50% in Somaliland and 57% in Mogadishu. Experts believe this is because of higher consumption and higher labour force participation. Households in Puntland consume a higher quantity per capita per item and more items per household. The lower rate of poverty does not appear to be driven by household size, as the average in Puntland is 5.2, compared to 5.7 in Somaliland and 4.5 in Mogadishu. Puntland is doing better in various important indicators of well-being. For instance, the literacy rate in Puntland is 64% compared to the national average of 55%. Additionally, households in Puntland also outperform the average in other educational outcomes such as enrolment and educational attainment. 70% of households in Puntland have access to improved water sources compared to the national average of 58%. Therefore, Puntland's higher performance on non-monetary indicators of well-being are inline with its lower rate of poverty.

Selected poverty indicators
	Poverty incidence (% of population)	Poverty gap (% of poverty line)	Poverty severity index	Total gap (per year, current million USD)
Puntland	27.2	7.9	3.5	49.2
Urban	26	7.5	3.4	40.4
Rural	34	10.1	4.1	8.8
Somaliland	50.0	19.2	9.3	229.8
Urban	47.9	18.2	8.9	179.7
Rural	61.1	24.2	11.4	50.1
Mogadishu	57.0	23.8	11.9	163.5
Somalia	51.4	21.7	11.5	1,318.4
Urban	45.0	17.1	8.4	476.3
Rural	52.5	19.7	9.1	627.5
IDP Settlements	70.5	36.5	22.2	214.6
The total monetary value of the poverty gap includes the entire Somali population.

In December 2011, a new commercial market opened in Bosaso's northern Dayaha ("Star") neighborhood, near the seaport. Approximately half a kilometer in size, it was designed to ensure easy vehicle access. The market is the result of careful planning between Puntland government officials and civil society representatives.

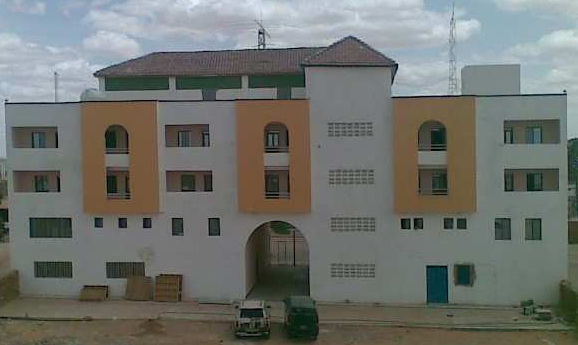
Amal Bank branch in Galkayo, Puntland

Bosaso is also home to Golis Telecom Somalia, the largest telecommunications operator in northeastern Somalia. Founded in 2002 with the objective of supplying the country with GSM mobile services, fixed line and internet services, it has an extensive network that covers all of the nation's major cities and more than 40 districts in both Puntland and Somaliland. Additionally, Netco has its headquarters in the city. Other telecommunication firms serving the region include Telcom and NationLink.

In April 2013, the Puntland Ministry of Fisheries and Marine Resources officially inaugurated a new fish market in Garowe. Constructed in conjunction with the UK authorities and the UNDP, it is part of a larger regional development plan that will see two other similar marketplaces launched within the year in Galkayo and Qardho.

In August 2014, in conjunction with the government of Djibouti and an international construction firm headquartered in China, the Puntland Transport and Seaports Ministry launched a project to establish new seaports in the regional state. The initiative is part of a broader campaign by the Puntland administration to focus on tapping into the region's commercial potential through various development projects.

=== Oil exploration ===
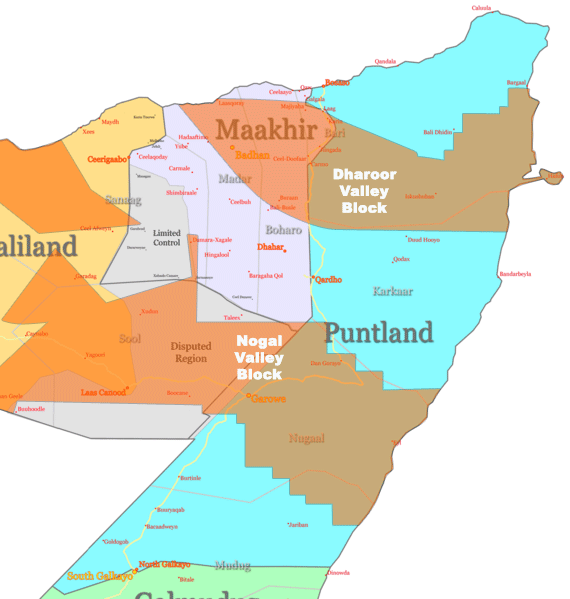
Oil blocks in Puntland

In the 2000s, the Puntland government began official negotiations with foreign oil companies over exploration rights in the area. The provincial authorities in October 2005 granted Range Resources a majority stake in two sizable land-based mineral and hydrocarbon exploration licenses, in addition to offshore rights. The onshore Nugaal and Dharoor Valley blocks in question span over 14,424 and 24,908 km^{2} (5,569 and 9,617 sq mi), respectively. Two years later, Range Resources obtained a 100% interest in the two blocks and concurrently farmed out 80% of that share to Canmex Minerals.

In January 2007, the Puntland administration, which was then led by President Mohamud Muse Hersi, signed the Puntland Product Sharing Agreement (PSA) with Range Resources Limited and the Canmex Minerals subsidiary Canmex Holdings (Bermuda) II Limited.

Following a change in leadership in 2009, the Puntland government, now led by President Abdirahman Mohamud Farole, sought to renegotiate the profit sharing agreement with Range Resources to ensure more favorable terms for the region. In 2012, the Puntland government gave the green light to the first official oil exploration project in Puntland and Somalia at large.

In 2017, Puntland ministers held a cabinet meeting where they approved an oil exploration deal with Chinese company CCECC, in return for constructing a road connecting Eyl and Garowe as well as renovations and refurbishments to the Abdullahi Yusuf Airport.

== Media ==
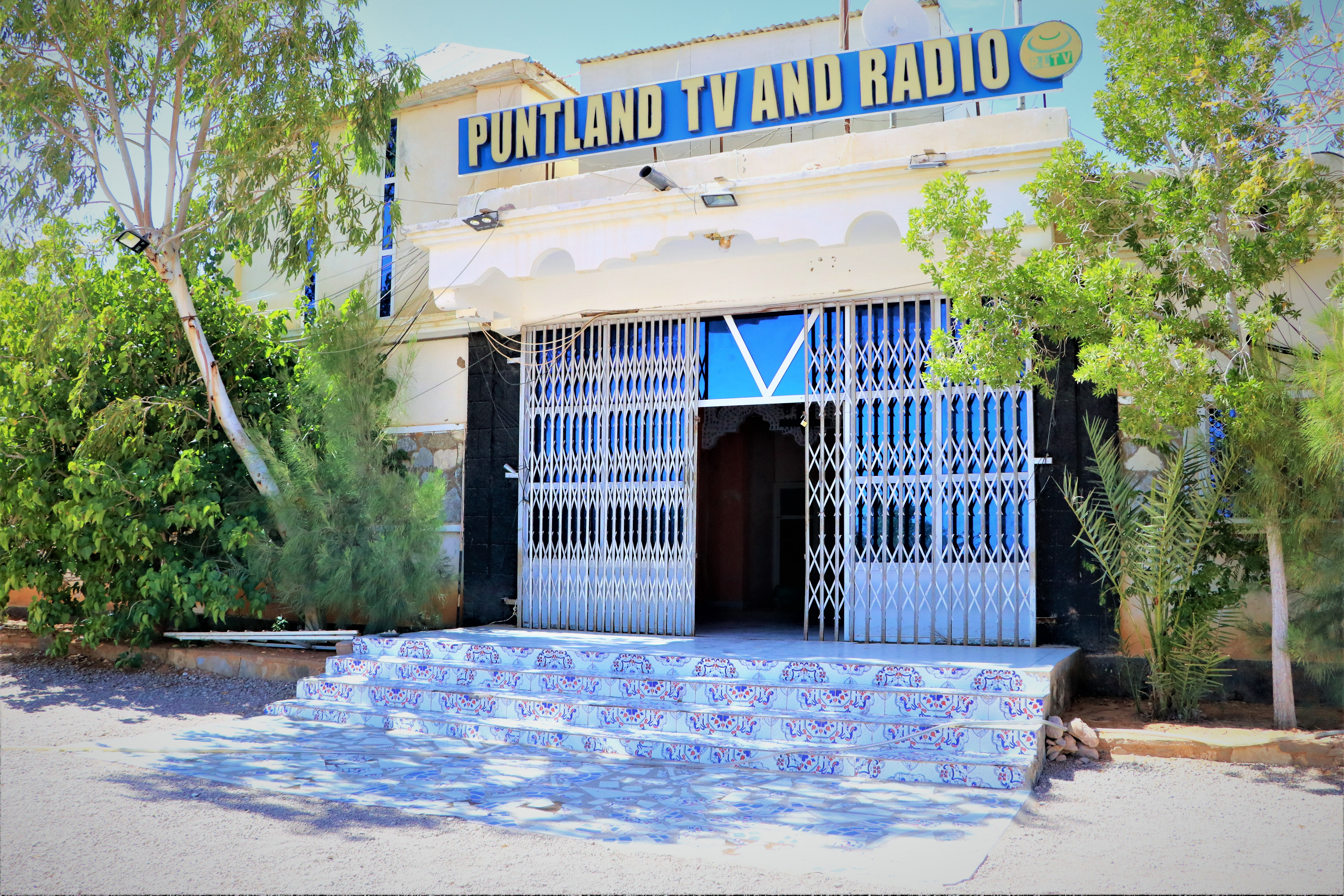
Puntland TV and Radio headquarters in Garowe.

Puntland has its own television channel and studios. Puntland TV and Radio is the public broadcasting network of the autonomous Puntland state of Somalia. Its headquarters are at the regional capital of Garowe. The service also maintains an office in London. Founded in April 2013, Puntland TV and Radio broadcasts locally in Somali via terrestrial service. It also airs programs globally through satellite. Radio Puntland broadcasts internationally via shortwave, with its transmission reaching as far as Finland. Its standard programming includes general news, focusing on regional developments, sports and entertainment.

The private stations Eastern Television Network (ETN TV) and Somali Broadcasting Corporation (SBC TV) broadcast from Bosaso.

Established in 2004, Radio Garowe is a community radio station based in Garowe. The station broadcasts daily from Somalia at 89.8 FM, covering all the latest headlines in Somali news, politics, and society. It also broadcasts other special programming on Garowe Online, its online sister website.

LaasqorayNET is another privately owned website based in Badhan, Bosaso, Dubai and London. The website features articles written in Somali and English. In addition, the website hosts some audio, though the latter is not regularly updated.

Radio Gaalkacyo is the state radio station. Based in Galkayo, it was formerly known as Radio Free Somalia.

Horseed Media was established in 2002 by a group of Somali intellectuals in the Netherlands and Finland. The station broadcasts from Bosaso and has a listening audience of about 80,000 people, with a reach of 150 km^{2} (58 sq mi). It also operates a website that counts over 10,000 daily visitors.

Based in Garowe, Puntland Post was established in 2001 by Somali expatriates in Denmark. Its website publishes daily domestic and international news reports and analysis in both Somali and English, with an emphasis on Puntland affairs.

Established in 2014, Puntland Star presents breaking news, stories and documentaries from Somalia and the rest of the world.

Other media organizations include Raxanreeb Online (RBC Radio). Launched in 2006, RBC presents Somali news to a global audience in both Somali and English. With direct sources based in Somalia, it covers local politics and society.

== Sports ==
=== Football ===
In 2017, the Puntland State League is formed with nine clubs.

== See also ==
- Federated state
- Somaliland-Puntland dispute
- Somali Salvation Democratic Front
- Majeerteen Sultanate
- Sultanate of Hobyo
