= Puntland Post =

Bilingual news website

- Website type: News website, weekly newspaper
- Available in: Somali, English
- Headquarters: Garowe, Puntland
- Website: puntlandpost.net
- Launched: 11 December 2001; 24 years ago
- Current status: Active

Puntland Post (PP) is an online publication and weekly newspaper based in Garowe, the capital of the autonomous state of Puntland. English and Somali languages are published on the news website.

== History ==
Puntland Post was established in 2001 by Somali expatriates in Denmark. Its website publishes daily local and regional news reports and analysis in both Somali and English, with an emphasis on Somalian affairs. Puntland Post also publishes a weekly newspaper in Somali language. Puntland Post has launched a monthly English language webzine called Puntland Post Monthly.

== See also ==
- Media of Somalia
