= Radio Gaalkacyo =

Radio station based in Galkayo, Somalia

- Website type: Somali news site
- Available in: Somali, English
- Owner: community radio
- Website: Radio Gaalkacyo
- Launched: 1993

Radio Gaalkacyo is a radio station based in Galkayo, Somalia.

== Overview ==
It has an associated website written in Somali and in English, presenting news and current events.

Formerly known as Radio Free Somalia, Radio Gaalkacyo currently counts 50,000 daily visitors to its website. It also has approximately 950,000 listeners on FM radio based in Galkayo and Garowe in the northeastern Puntland region, with a reach of more than 250 km^{2}.

== See also ==
- Media of Somalia
- Radio Garowe
- Radio Laascaanood
- Radio Mogadishu
- Radio Daljir
