= Horn Cable Television =

Horn Cable Tv
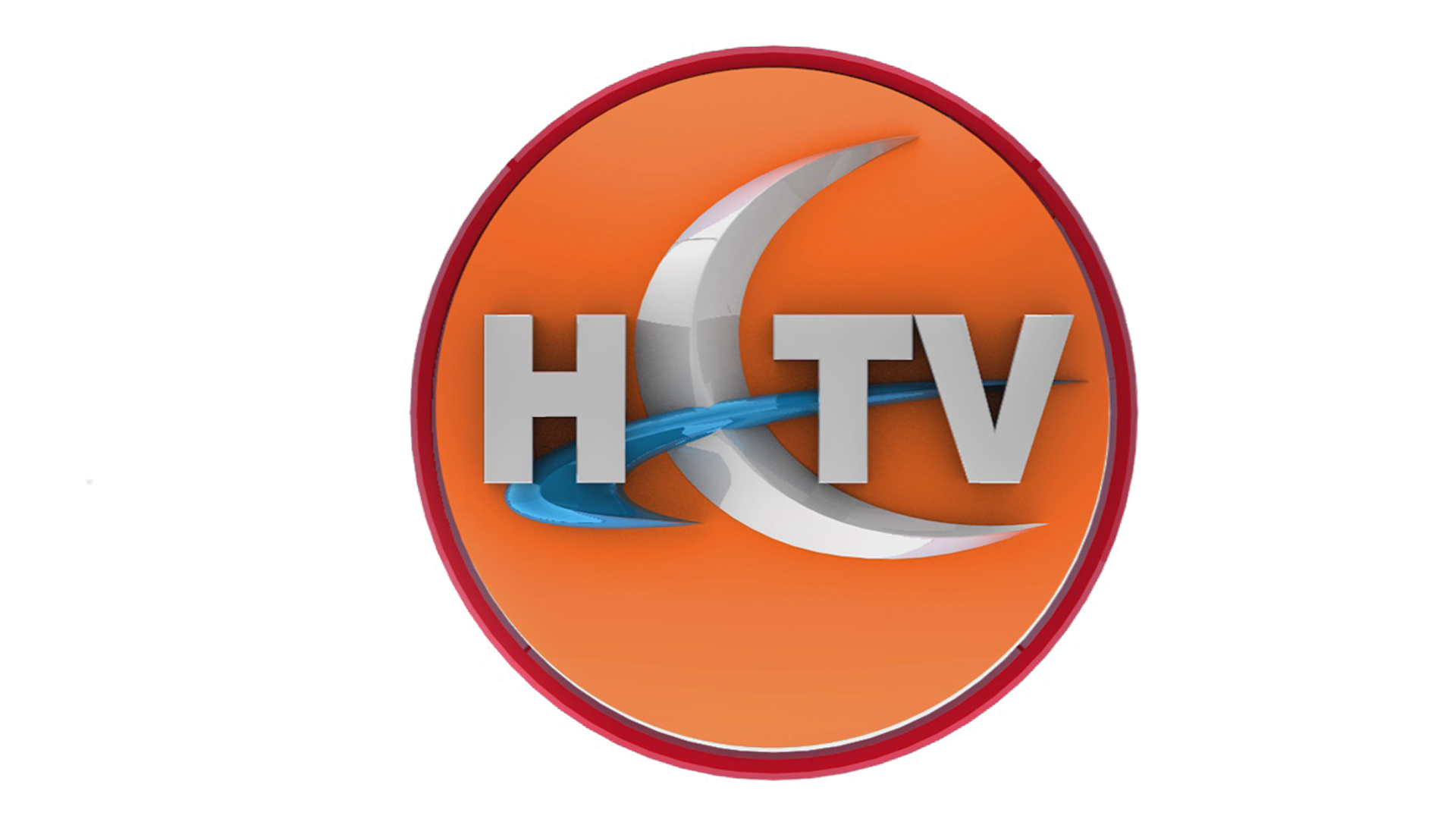
- HCTV
- Country: Somaliland
- Broadcast area: Horn of Africa
- Network: HORNSAT
- Headquarters: Hargeisa

Programming
- Language: Somali
- Picture format: 1080i HDTV
- Timeshift service: HCTV

Ownership
- Owner: Farhan Haji Ali

History
- Launched: May 29, 2003; 22 years ago
- Former names: Hargeisa Cable TV

Links
- Website: hctv.tv

Horn Cable TV (HCTV) is a Somali news-based private television channel.

== Overview ==
Founded in 2003, Horn Cable TV broadcasts in Somali from its headquarters in Hargeisa, the capital of Somaliland. The station also has studios in Birmingham and London, among other areas.

Horn Cable TV is owned by Farhan Haji Ali, a Hargeisa-based Somali entrepreneur who is also the owner of the FAACO.

The station generates revenue from advertising.

== Programs ==
Horn Cable TV broadcasts around-the-clock across Somaliland. Through satellite, its transmissions also reach other parts of the continent, Europe, Asia, and areas in Australia. The station is also available as a live webstream.

HCTV's programming covers a wide range of genres. Among these are news and current affairs, business, politics, drama, music and religious programs.

== Staff ==
Horn Cable Television has a staff of around 90 ground reporters, who are stationed throughout the Horn of Africa region and nearby areas. Around 60 journalists are based at the station's headquarters, with additional personnel of 7 in Mogadishu.

Mohamoud Sheikh Dalmar serves as a radio and television producer for the channel. Additionally, Hamdi Hussein is the Director of its Mogadishu branch.

== Memberships ==
Horn Cable TV is member of the National Union of Somali Journalists (NUSOJ).

== See also ==
- Media of Somalia
- Universal Television (Somalia)
- Eastern Television Network
- Somaliland National TV
- Puntland TV and Radio
- Xiddigaha Geeska
