= Somaliland National TV =

Somali television channel

Somaliland National Television
- Country: Somaliland
- Broadcast area: Horn of Africa
- Headquarters: Hargeisa

Programming
- Languages: Somali, English
- Picture format: 1080i HDTV

Ownership
- Owner: Government of Somaliland

History
- Launched: July 20, 2005; 20 years ago

Somaliland National Television (SLNTV, Somali: Telefishanka Qaranka Somaliland) is a Somali television channel. It is the official public service station of the government of Somaliland. Founded in 2005, it broadcasts from the country's capital of Hargeisa via terrestrial transmission, as well as to other parts of Africa and the Middle East, and Europe and Asia through satellite. The channel focuses on general Somali news, particularly items on the regional authorities. It also carries sports, entertainment and humanitarian programs.

== History ==
Somaliland had its first private television stations in 1997, the Somaliland Space Channel.

SLNTV started broadcasting in on 20 July 2005, ahead of the parliamentary election held on 29 September. In an initial phase, coverage was limited to a 1.5kw transmitter in Hargeysa, the national capital, while signal reach would cover Burco, Berbera and Boorama in a second phase. A third phase would see the launch of the station on satellite. It was the second television station to go on air in Somaliland after Somaliland Television, a commercial television channel. The channel had a limited audience, given that very few people owned a television set. During its first year and a half on air, SLNTV lacked "effective" programs and failed to compete against the private channels. Over time, SLNTV started airing weekly programs primarily aimed at raising awareness of issues as well as announcements and achievements from the government.

== Controversies ==
During the 2005 election campaign, SLNTV was accused of broadcasting propaganda rather than "even-handed coverage". The Election Board of Monitors rebuked SLNTV over its bias to the ruling party.

== See also ==
- Media of Somaliland
- Horn Cable Television
- Somali Broadcasting Corporation
- Universal Television (Somalia)
