= Shabelle Media Network =

- Country: Somalia
- Availability: 101.5 MHz/Somalia
- Headquarters: Mogadishu
- Area: Degmada Hodan, Ex Arwada (Taleeh)
- Owner: Abdimaalik Yusuf Banna
- Key people: Abuukar Sheikh Mohamud (General Director)
- Established: 2002
- Launch date: 6 May 2002
- Official website: shabellemedia.com

Shabelle Media Network (SMN) is a radio and television news organization based in Mogadishu, Somalia.

== History ==
The Shabelle Media Network was founded in 2002 in Merca, Somalia, by a group of young Somali intellectuals. Its mission was to ensure that Somalis around the world remain abreast of developments within the Somali community and in touch with each other.

The network's first phase was focused on airing to Africa, Asia and Australia via Thaicom 3 satellite. In 2005, it expanded to include satellite broadcasts to North America and Europe.

SMN's Radio Shabelle slowly grew to become one of Somalia's most respected privately owned radio stations, airing from 6 a.m. to midnight. It later relocated its headquarters to the national capital, Mogadishu.

Prior to Mogadishu's pacification by the Somali National Army in mid-2011, the independent Radio Shabelle, among other Somali media outlets, was frequently targeted by Islamist militants. Among the casualties during this most volatile 2007 to 2011 period was Radio Shabelle's acting manager, Bashir Nur Gedi, who was killed on October 19, 2007. In 2009, the station's director Mukhtar Mohamed Hirabe was also assassinated.

After their ouster, the insurgents resorted to issuing death threats and targeted assassinations in order to discourage reporting on their activities. Due to frustration at the increasing number of expatriate journalists returning to the capital after the relative improvement in security, the militants in 2012 intensified their anti-media campaign, killing four SMN reporters during the year, including director Hassan Osman Abdi.

Despite the attempted intimidation, journalists have persisted in covering the war beat. Through membership in the National Union of Somali Journalists (NUSOJ), reporters are also spearheading a governmental initiative to reform the 2007 Somali media law.

== Services ==
SMN broadcasts news, business, analysis, culture and sports items via its radio and television network. It airs its own programs and documentaries through both terrestrial and satellite transmissions. The organization also reports on domestic peace initiatives and conferences, provides a platform for the discussion of issues of interest to the Somali community, and offers call-in services wherein listeners or viewers can interact with program participants.

Shabelle Media Network's main target audience is the Somali community, both within the Horn of Africa and abroad. Its broadcasts are also geared toward local policy makers and international stakeholders.

== Awards ==
In 2010, Radio Shabelle was awarded the Media of the Year prize by the Paris-based journalism organization, Reporters Without Borders (RSF).

== See also ==
- List of journalists killed during the Somali civil war
- Media of Somalia
