= Somali Broadcasting Corporation =

Media group in Puntland, Somalia

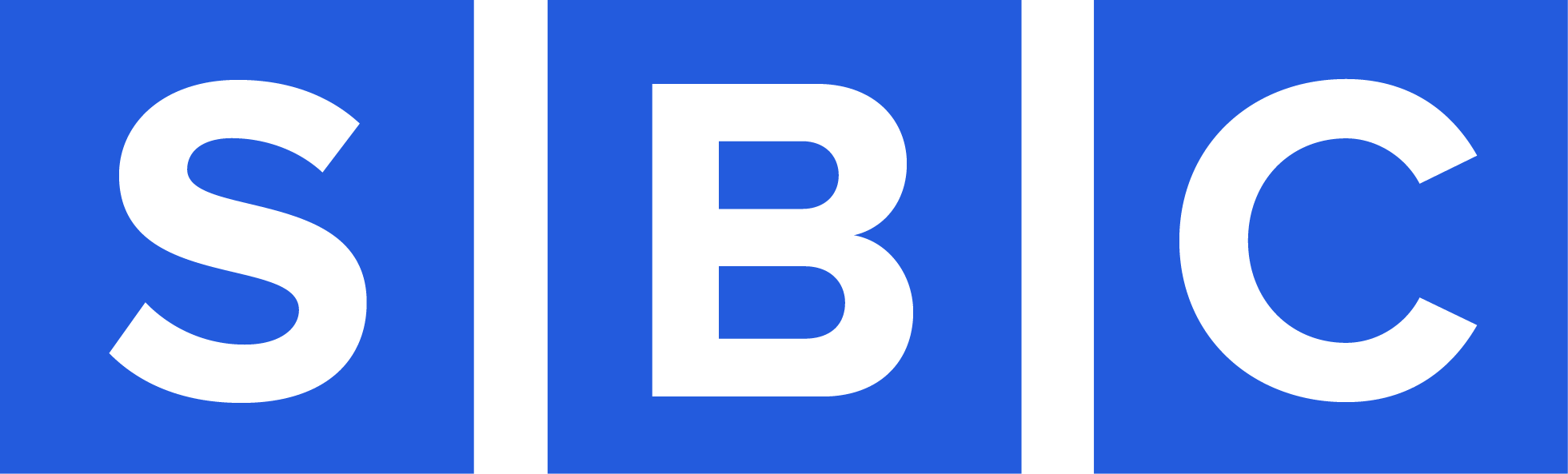
- Website type: Private
- Available in: Somali language, English language
- Founded: 2001
- Country of origin: Somalia
- Founders: Ali Abdi Aware,
- Industry: Mass media
- Website: allsbc.com

Somali Broadcasting Corporation (SBC) is a media group that operates in the Puntland region of Somalia, in particular the three main cities of Bossaso, Qardho and Garowe. SBC's broadcasting area of coverage is estimated at 1000 square km, and this is served by three stations in the above towns.

SBC was established in June 2001. Its first FM radio services were established in the Puntland region and it was the first FM Radio which could be heard in three cities in Somalia. In November 2001, Somali Broadcasting Corporation established the first television service in Puntland. This is now on air for test and it will go on air completely at the end of November 2018.

== Collaborations ==
In 2001, SBC contracted with the BBC Somali Service to broadcast their transmission through FM radio for better hearing. In 2004, SBC started airing Arabic and English programs of the BBC World Service.

SBC Radio has collaborated with some international organizations. A number of United Nations organizations including UNICEF, UNESCO, World Health Organization, IRIN, have their programs aired. Others include international organization such as Care International, Save the Children, and other local NGOs. Issues covered in these programs include HIV/AIDS, FGM, sanitation, and education.

== SBC mission ==
In respect of the current situation in Somalia, and the demand for information in the world, SBC's mission can be summarized as:

- Speeding free and fair information to listeners in Puntland, Somalia and neighboring countries
- Raising awareness in the community of all aspects of social sectors including health, education, and peace building
- Giving fair and confident access to the airwaves for all ranks so as to share opinions and ideas
- Promoting both small and large-scale business by advertisements
- Creating interaction among the war-divided people of Somalia
- SBC is neutral, non-political and non-partisan and aims to be one of the most respected media organizations in Puntland and the whole of Somalia

== Broadcasting ==
=== Radio ===
SBC broadcasts from three main stations:

- Boosaaso FM 89.0 MHz, 10.4 MHz
- Garowe Studio FM 88.7 MHz
- Gardo Studio FM 88.7 MHz
- Burao Studio FM 89.0;MHz

=== Television ===
- SBC TV covers All Somali Areas and its area.

== See also ==
- Media of Somalia
