= Corruption in Somalia =

Corruption in Somalia pertains to purported levels of corruption within Somalia's public and private sectors according to official metrics, anti-graft measures aimed at addressing those issues, as well as political dispensations and structural changes in government affecting transparency. Owing to a reported lack of accountability in the receipt and expenditure of public funds by the Transitional Federal Government, a federal Anti-Corruption Commission was put into place in 2011 to deter and eliminate graft.

On Transparency International's 2025 Corruption Perceptions Index, Somalia scored 9 on a scale from 0 ("highly corrupt") to 100 ("very clean"). When ranked by score, Somalia ranked 181st among the 182 countries in the Index, where the country ranked first is perceived to have the most honest public sector and Somalia tied with South Sudan for the lowest ranking. For comparison with regional scores, the best score among sub-Saharan African countries (Note: Angola, Benin, Botswana, Burkina Faso, Burundi, Cameroon, Cape Verde, Central African Republic, Chad, Comoros, Côte d'Ivoire, Democratic Republic of the Congo, Djibouti, Equatorial Guinea, Eritrea, Eswatini, Ethiopia, Gabon, Gambia, Ghana, Guinea, Guinea-Bissau, Kenya, Lesotho, Liberia, Madagascar, Malawi, Mali, Mauritania, Mauritius, Mozambique, Namibia, Niger, Nigeria, Republic of the Congo, Rwanda, Sao Tome and Principe, Senegal, Seychelles, Sierra Leone, Somalia, South Africa, South Sudan, Sudan, Tanzania, Togo, Uganda, Zambia, and Zimbabwe.) was 68, the average was 32 and the worst was Somalia and South Sudan's 9. For comparison with worldwide scores, the best score was 89 (ranked 1), the average was 42, and the worst was Somalia and South Sudan's 9.

In 2012, Somali and international stakeholders also agreed to establish a joint financial management board in order to ensure transparent dispensation of government and donor funds. The public sector was later completely reformed in mid-2012, following the end of the transitional period and the establishment of the Federal Government of Somalia.

In 2013, the Somali federal government announced that it had launched a new Public Finance Management Policy (PFMP) to render more transparent, accurate and timely its public sector financial system, and to strengthen the delivery capacity of the government's financial sector. A parliamentary finance committee was also established in 2014, which oversees all withdrawal transactions from the Central Bank. Additionally, a Public Procurement, Concessions and Disposal Act was passed, and the Office of the Auditor General (OAG) was established to audit all government institutions. The government also began utilizing a free asset recovery system supported by the UNODC and World Bank, and it concurrently launched an anti-graft Public Awareness Campaign.

== Coalition government ==
=== Overview ===
Corruption was deemed a widespread problem during the brief tenure of Somalia's coalition government. The unity administration was formed in 2008 after a UN-brokered conference in Djibouti between representatives of the Somali Transitional Federal Government (TFG) and the moderate Islamist Alliance for the Re-liberation of Somalia (ARS), which ended in an agreement calling for the expansion of parliament to 550 seats in order to accommodate the new ARS members.

In 2010, Transparency International ranked Somalia in last place on its annual Corruption Perceptions Index, a metric that purports to show the perception of corruption in a country's public sector. A 2012 World Bank report also alleged that about $130 million or 68% of the funds that the coalition government had received over the 2009 and 2010 period were unaccounted for.

An earlier 2011 paper prepared for the TFG by the Public Finance Management Unit, a Somali government body tasked with overseeing the nation's fiscal management, similarly suggested that over $70 million in cash payments from Arab donor countries were missing over the same 2009-2010 period. Largely based on interviews with Mogadishu politicians who had witnessed the payments or received funds, the report alleged that a total of $300 million was unaccounted for once internal revenue was also taken into consideration.

By contrast, funds from Western nations nominally earmarked for security and social service-related initiatives in Somalia mainly went directly to aid agencies, with very little of it ultimately reaching the Somali authorities. According to the then Finance Minister Hussein Halane, although government officials routinely deposited foreign contributions in the Central Bank of Somalia, some of the money was first spent on legitimate and documented expenses.

In July 2012, a report by the UN Monitoring Group on Somalia and Eritrea (SEMG) submitted to the UN Security Council again alleged that between 2009 and 2010, around 70 percent of funds that had been earmarked for development and reconstruction in Somalia were unaccounted for. President Sharif Sheikh Ahmed rebuked the claims, indicating in particular that a $3 million payment from the Government of Oman had gone toward legitimate government expenses, including loans, security forces and parliament. Ahmed also asserted that the SEMG paper had been "timed to coincide with the end of [the] transition period in order to discredit the TFG," and that the Monitoring Group was the "wrong approach for Somalia's peace and development." The Prime Minister's Office released a statement describing the report as misleading and false, and suggested that it would consider filing a defamation and libel lawsuit if some of the accusations contained in the report were not retracted.

=== Anti-corruption measures ===
In 2010, a new technocratic administration was appointed to office, which enacted a number of reforms, including measures to tackle purported graft within the public sector. According to the Prime Minister, Cabinet ministers fully disclosed their assets and signed a code of ethics in order to improve transparency. An Anti-Corruption Commission with the power to carry out formal investigations and to review government decisions and protocols was also established so as to more closely monitor all activities by public officials. Unnecessary trips abroad by members of government were prohibited, and all travel by ministers subsequently required the Prime Minister's consent.

A budget outlining 2011's federal expenditures was also put before and approved by members of parliament, with the payment of civil service employees prioritized. A full audit of government property and vehicles was put into place.

Following the London Somalia Conference held in February 2012, Somali and international stakeholders further upheld existing plans to establish a joint financial management board in order to ensure a transparent dispensation of Somali and donor funds. They also pledged support for Somalia's stable regions, agreeing to form a new fund earmarked for local dispute resolution, job creation, basic service delivery and development of government sectors. The U.S. government indicated that it would lobby for the imposition of sanctions on all parties impeding political progress made by the Somali Transitional Federal Government, including pre-emptive measures such as travel bans and asset freezes.

== Federal government ==
=== Overview ===
Concurrent with the end of the TFG's interim mandate on August 20, 2012, the Federal Parliament of Somalia was inaugurated, ushering in the Federal Government of Somalia, the first permanent central government in the country since the start of the civil war. On September 10, 2012, parliament also elected a new President, who then appointed a new Prime Minister on October 6, 2012, both newcomers to Somali politics. A new Cabinet was later endorsed by the legislature on November 13, 2012.

In July 2013, the UN Monitoring Group on Somalia and Eritrea (SEMG) alleged that 80 percent of withdrawals from the Central Bank of Somalia were made for private purposes. While acknowledging that the new national leadership presented an opportunity for change, the panel also suggested that the Bank was operating as a patronage system for government officials. Newly appointed Central Bank Governor Abdisalam Omer described the charges as "an attempt to discredit me as the governor of the central bank and to discredit the embryonic financial institutions of the country." He also indicated that of the $16.9 million in funds that the panel alleged were missing, the majority had been deposited in a Finance Ministry account at the Central Bank, with the remaining $940,000 deposited in an account that a former prime minister had established for regional relations. According to Omer, the bank deposits had been made with the assistance and signatures of PricewaterhouseCoopers (PWC) representatives.

The president's office concurrently issued a statement rejecting the allegations, indicating that they dated from a previous administration. Shortly afterwards, the Somali authorities hired forensic accountants from FTI Consulting, Inc. and a legal team from the US firm Shulman, Rogers, Gandal, Pordy & Ecker, PA to investigate the charges.

In September 2013, the Somali government announced that the auditors had found that the methodology and conclusions of the SEMG report's Annex 5.2 were "deeply flawed and entirely unreliable." The auditing firms consequently recommended the removal of the section of the SEMG's report containing corruption allegations. They also requested that the United Nations Security Council publicly sanction the SEMG for failing to adhere to and apply the UN's internal fact-finding standards. Additionally, the auditors recommended that the UN reimburse the Somali authorities for the expenses they incurred over the course of the auditing investigations.

In late July 2013, the UN announced that it would establish an independent adjudication panel tasked with verifying and reviewing all future SEMG reports before publication. Effective August, when the monitoring group's mandate was slated for renewal, the UN indicated that it would require substantially higher standards of evidence from the SEMG. The announcement came a few days after the Somali government demanded the creation of such a panel to supervise all of the monitoring group's future papers. Many had also raised concerns about the validity of the SEMG's yearly reports due to their extensive reliance on obscure and anonymous sources.

On 13 September 2013, Yussur A.F. Abrar succeeded Omer as Governor of the Central Bank of Somalia. She stepped down from the position in November, citing interference with the bank's functions as among the main reasons for her departure, as well as pressure to sanction deals that she suggested were in violation of her fiduciary responsibility as head of the national monetary authority.

On 27 November 2013, veteran banker Bashir Isse was appointed on an interim basis as Somalia's new Central Bank Governor. According to incumbent Finance Minister Mohamud Hassan Suleiman, Isse's appointment came a day after President Hassan Sheikh Mohamud met with international donor representatives in Mogadishu to discuss a temporary replacement at the position. The Council of Ministers later endorsed the selection on 28 November. On 24 April 2014, the federal Cabinet approved Isse as the new permanent Governor of the Central Bank of Somalia. Maryan Abdullahi Yusuf was also named as his new Deputy Governor.

In July 2014, the eight-member UN Monitoring Group on Somalia and Eritrea (SEMG) accused presidential advisor and entrepreneur Musa Haji Mohamed Ganjab of illicitly receiving a portion of Somalia's frozen state assets that had been recovered from abroad. The panel also alleged that Ganjab had ties with Al-Shabaab and that he had engaged in the unauthorized diversion of Somali government weapons to the militants. Reuters could not confirm the group's allegations. Additionally, Ganjab denied the accusations and suggested that they were part of a campaign by the SEMG's Coordinator Jarat Chopra to undermine the Somali authorities as well as individuals like himself who had helped repudiate the panel's 2013 report.

In an August press conference, attorney Jeremy Schulman from the law firm Shulman Rogers similarly suggested that Chopra's criticism of the asset recovery process was politically motivated and deliberately misleading. He also indicated that all $31 million in government funds that the SEMG alleged were missing had been accounted for and were transferred to Central Bank of Somalia accounts in the United States and Turkey, and that it was both legal and appropriate for the Somali central government to want to reclaim its own state assets.

==== Cancellation of contracts ====
In September 2014, at the recommendation of the new financial governance committee, the Somali government announced that it was renegotiating or canceling nine high-profile contracts. The decision came after the committee of senior domestic and international officials found various irregularities, with none of the contracts having a competitive tender process according to committee member Nigel Roberts of the World Bank. The contracts ranged from oil exploration to port operations, and included deals with the British Soma Oil and Gas firm, the American Shulman Rogers law firm, and the Turkish company Favori. According to officials, eight of the contracts were being amended.

The deal with Favori was finalized at the end of the month, with the government delegating management of the Port of Mogadishu to the firm. The contract with Shulman Rogers was concurrently terminated due to its prohibitive cost, and the Central Bank requested that the company transfer a full list of overseas state assets that its investigation had yielded.

=== Anti-corruption measures ===
In May 2014, the federal Cabinet unanimously passed a new Public Procurement, Concessions and Disposal Act, which Finance Minister Halane had tabled. The law formalizes principles, procedures and decisions with regard to agreements entered into by public institutions, and procurement of goods, services and concessions with public funds. It aims to spur economic development and establish a foundation for transparent financial governance by eliminating mismanagement of public funds, reducing monopolies and promoting competitiveness in the concession procurement process.

The Act is expected to regulate the national public financial sector, ameliorate accountability, and ensure that public funds are utilized in accordance with their intended purpose. Through sound price management of services and commodities, it also aims to strengthen financial governance and institutions by optimizing values on public expenditures. Parliament is now expected to deliberate on the bill for adoption.

In July 2014, the Office of the Auditor General (OAG) was officially opened within the Ministry of Finance compound in Mogadishu. It is mandated to audit all government institutions, including ensuring appropriate management of government funds and strengthening public transparency and accountability. Among its first initiatives, the OAG outlined statutory regulations vis-à-vis government institutional accountability, which were approved by the Somali Council of Ministers and await parliamentary endorsement.

In September 2014, the Somali government began utilizing a new, free asset recovery system supported by the UNODC and World Bank.

In September 2014, the Somali government also launched a Public Awareness Campaign to tackle and prevent corruption in the public sector and to strengthen good governance. According to the project's director, Minister of Information Mustaf Ali Duhulow, it will consist of anti-corruption programs, which are scheduled to air on radio and television stations, newspapers, websites, social media and various other local media outlets. The initiative will broadcast public service announcements aimed at the average citizen, as well as establish call-in programs, debates, discussions and public events. The minister also indicated that the public awareness campaign would be accompanied by a civic education drive to inform the citizenry on anti-graft legislation, reporting and enforcement.

The Ministry of Finance and Planning has a number of internal policies and procedures which are intended to address corruption.

== Private sector ==
Somalia's economy is heavily dominated by the informal sector, and particularly by livestock, remittances and telecommunications. The International Crisis Group (ICG) notes that while the "chaotic, unregulated laissez-faire market system" that came into existence after the collapse of the Siyad Barre regime in 1991 is generally seen as unleashing an entrepreneurial spirit in Somalia, it is also partly responsible for fuelling corruption. According to the ICG and the U4 Anti-Corruption Resource Centre, the vibrant Somali telecoms sector is seen as particularly corrupt.
