= 2004 Somali presidential election =

- October 10, 2004

All 281MPs of the TFP 150 votes needed to win
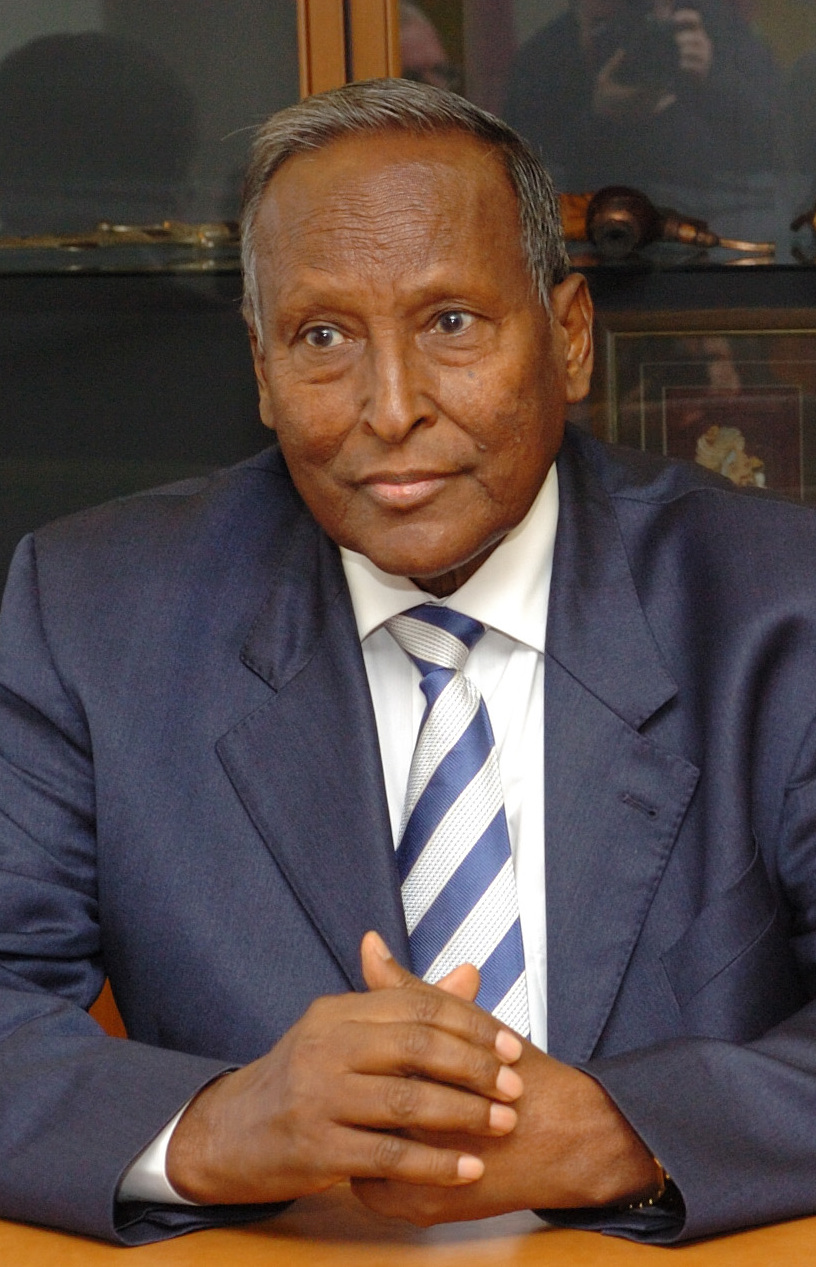

Candidate	Abdullahi Yusuf Ahmed	Abdullahi Ahmed Addow
Party	Independent	Independent
Electoral vote	189	79
Percentage	70.52%	30.97%
President before election
Abdiqasim Salad Hassan
Independent
Elected President
Abdullahi Yusuf Ahmed
Independent

Indirect presidential elections were held in Somalia on 10 October 2004. The president was elected by the Transitional Federal Parliament. The election process involved multiple rounds of voting, with various candidates vying for the presidency. Former President of Puntland, Abdullahi Yusuf Ahmed, was elected as the 6th President of Somalia.

== Results ==
In the first round, Abdullahi Yusuf Ahmed emerged as the frontrunner with 29.30% of the votes. Subsequently, he secured increasing support in the second and third rounds, ultimately winning the election with a significant majority. Other candidates withdrew from the competition at various stages, contributing to Abdullahi Yusuf Ahmed's clear victory.

Candidate	First round		Second round		Third round	
Candidate	Votes	%	Votes	%	Votes	%
Abdullahi Yusuf Ahmed	80	29.30	147	54.85	189	70.52
Abdullahi Ahmed Addow	35	12.82	83	30.97	79	29.48
Mohamed Afrah Qanyare	33	12.09	38	14.18		
Abdulrahman Jamma Barre	18	6.59				
Abdiqasim Salad Hassan	16	5.86				
Mohammed Hassan Adow	14	5.13				
Musa Sudi Yalahow	13	4.76				
Osman Jama Ali	10	3.66				
Jeylani Ali Kediye	9	3.30				
Hussein Mohamed Aydid	9	3.30				
Farah Weheliye Addo	8	2.93				
Mohamed Omar Habeb	6	2.20				
Mumin Ibrahim Isak	4	1.47				
Ali Omar Hasan Guled	3	1.10				
Abdi Guled Mohamed	3	1.10				
Mahdi Abukar Mahud	2	0.73				
Ahmed Abdi Hashi	2	0.73				
Mohamed Yasin Ismail	2	0.73				
Asha Ahmed Abdalla	2	0.73				
Qadir Sufi	1	0.37				
Abdi Osman	1	0.37				
Abdirahman Abdi Aware	1	0.37				
Osman Mohamed Farah	1	0.37				
Ali Lahi Mohamed	0	0.00				
Sheikh Omar Qasim	0	0.00				
Jama Hassan Khalif	0	0.00				
Total	273	100.00	268	100.00	268	100.00
Registered voters/turnout	275	–	275	–	275	–
Source: Somalia Talk, African Elections Database
