= Civil Aviation Caretaker Authority for Somalia =

Civial Aviation Caretaker Authority of Somalia
Programme overview
- Formed: 1996
- Jurisdiction: Somalia
- Headquarters: Mogadishu, Somalia
- Parent department: United Nations Development Programme

The Civil Aviation Caretaker Authority of Somalia (CACAS) is a civil aviation authority programme created in 1996 by the International Civil Aviation Organization and the United Nations Development Programme, with a mandate in Somalia.

== Establishment and duties ==
Based in Nairobi, the CACAS served as a caretaker for Somalia's airspace since the collapse of the central government in the early 1990s following the outbreak of the civil war. The organization collected over-flight revenues on behalf of the country, re-investing the proceeds into air traffic control and airport maintenance. It had among its objectives the upkeep and operation of services and equipment earmarked for international air transport activities, including local operations within the Mogadishu Flight Information Region and humanitarian flights.

Additionally, CACAS was mandated with forming and operating a nucleus civil aviation administration to oversee its functions, establishing protocols and regulations vis-a-vis the maintenance and operation of civil aviation activities, and devising and implementing a training program geared toward national-level staff. However, these latter tasks were reportedly not completed. It is also uncertain where exactly the estimated $9 to $10 million in annual revenue generated by the airspace management services were invested. SCAA is now directed by Ahmed Moallim Hassan.

== Transitional period ==
In 2002, the newly formed Transitional National Government (TNG) briefly re-assumed control of Somalia's airspace with the re-establishment of the Somali Civil Aviation Authority (SOMCAA) by the Ministry of Air and Land Transport.

With the creation of the TNG's successor the Transitional Federal Government (TFG) in 2004, the reconstituted central government of Somalia resumed formal preparations in 2011 to transfer supervision of the country's airspace from the CACAS to its aviation ministry. After reassuming control of the capital Mogadishu in mid-2011, the TFG also on a contractual basis delegated airport maintenance and operation duties at the Aden Adde International Airport to the Dubai-based SKA Air and Logistics, a private firm specializing in conflict zones.

== Transfer of airspace control ==
After meeting with CACAS representatives, Abdullahi Elmoge Hersi, Somalia's Minister of Information, Posts and Telecommunications, announced in May 2013 that the Somali federal government would reassume control of the country's airspace by December 31. In preparation for the transition, staff within Somalia were set to receive training during the rest of the year. Over 100 airspace personnel were also scheduled to be transferred to Mogadishu for management duties.

On 17 December 2014, Minister of Air and Land Transport Said Jama Mohamed announced that the Somali federal government had regained control of its airspace after reaching an agreement with the International Civil Aviation Organization. The minister also indicated that Somalia's airspace would be managed from the capital Mogadishu, and additional professionals would be trained for the purpose. On the 28 December 2017 the Somali government regained control of their airspace for the first time in nearly 27 years after control was passed from ICAO to the Somali Federal Government.

== See also ==
- List of civil aviation authorities
- United Nations
