= Postage stamps and postal history of Somalia =

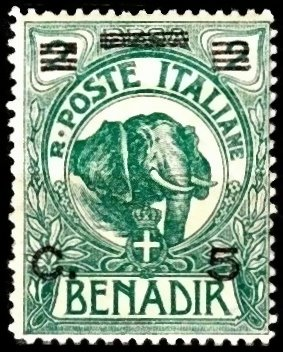
The first postage stamp in Somalia was created by the Italian authorities in their "Benadir": the 1907 stamp of Benadir, surcharged in 1926.

The following is a survey of the postage stamps and postal history of Somalia. From the late 1800s to 1960, northwestern present-day Somalia was administered as British Somaliland, while the northeastern, central and southern part of the country were concurrently administered as Italian Somaliland. In 1960, the two territories were unified as the Somali Republic.

== Italian Somaliland ==
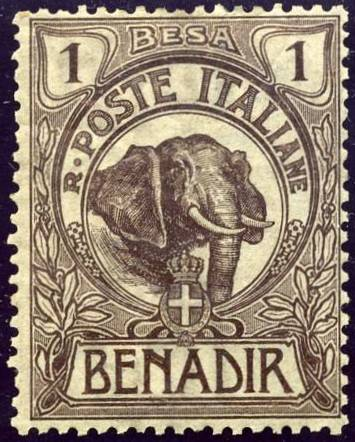
A stamp issued for the Benadir Company in 1903

=== Benadir issues ===
The first stamps of Somalia were issued for the Benadir Company by the Italian authorities in 1903.

=== Italian colony ===
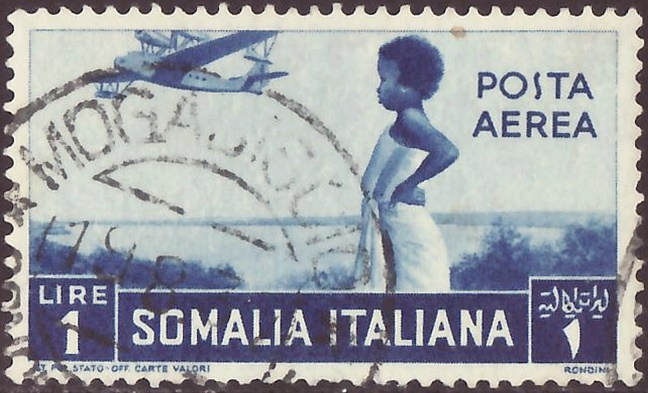
A stamp of Italian Somalia, 1936.

In 1905, Italy assumed the responsibility of creating a colony in Somalia, following revelations that the Benadir Company had tolerated or collaborated in the perpetuation of the slave trade.

The first stamps were overprinted on the stamps of Benadir in 1905. Further issues were overprinted on the stamps of Benadir until 1926. From 1916 the stamps of Italy were also overprinted for use in Italian Somaliland. The first set of definitives inscribed "Somalia" was issued in 1930.

Governor Maurizio Rava created the first system of postal service stations in Italian Somaliland, that was fully enlarged in 1937.

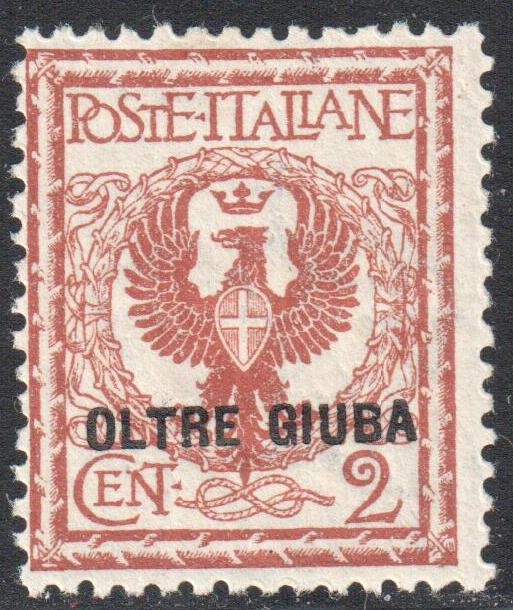
A stamp of Trans-Juba from 1925

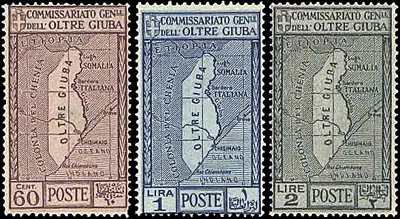
Oltre Juba stamp from 1926

=== Trans-Juba issues ===
Italian Trans-Juba was established in 1924, after Britain ceded the northern portion of the Jubaland region to Italy.

The first stamps for the new colony were issued on 29 July 1925, consisting of Italian stamps overprinted Oltre Giuba. Trans-Juba was integrated into Italian Somaliland in 1925, .

=== Italian East Africa ===
Between 1936 and 1941, stamps were issued for use in Italian East Africa, called in Italian Africa Orientale Italiana (A.O.I.), consisted of Italian Eritrea, Ethiopia and Italian Somaliland.

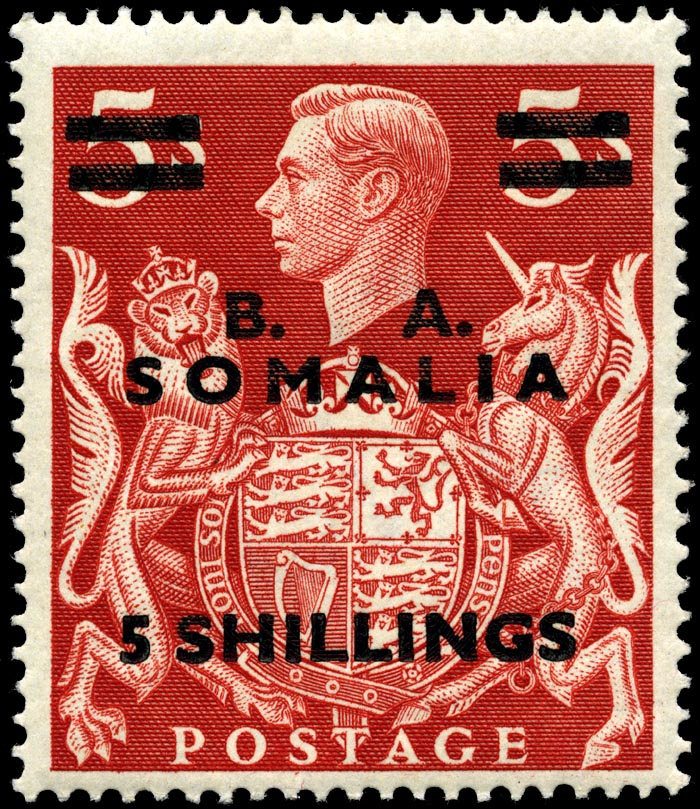
Stamp of the British administration in Italian Somalia

=== British administration in Italian Somaliland ===
After British forces occupied Italian Somaliland during World War II, British stamps overprinted M.E.F. (Middle East Forces) were used. British stamps overprinted "E.A.F." (East Africa Forces) were also used, beginning 15 January 1943.

These were replaced by issues overprinted B.M.A. SOMALIA and later B.A. SOMALIA, reflecting the change from British military to British civil administration. Stamps overprinted in this way were in use from 1948 to 1950.

=== Trust Territory of Somalia ===
In 1949, when the British military administration ended, Italian Somaliland became a United Nations trusteeship known as the Trust Territory of Somaliland. Under Italian administration, this trust territory lasted ten years, from 1950 to 1960. Stamps issued during this interval were inscribed in both Italian and Somali.

== British Somaliland ==
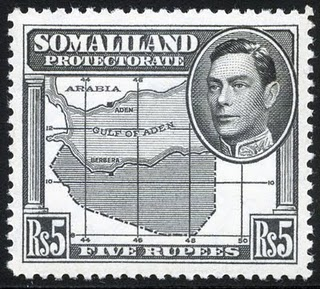
A 1938 stamp of British Somaliland showing a map of British Somaliland

Stamps were issued from 1903 to 1960 for the British area, first as British Somaliland, and later as the Somaliland Protectorate.

On 26 June 1960, the British Somaliland protectorate briefly gained independence as the State of Somaliland before uniting as scheduled five days later with the Trust Territory of Somaliland to form the Somali Republic on 1 July 1960. A set of stamps was issued with stamps from Italian Somaliland overprinted "Somaliland Independence 26 June 1960".

== Somali Republic ==
Following the establishment of the Somali Republic, the first stamps of the nascent country were issued on 1 July 1960.

After the 1969 military coup, the country and its stamps were renamed the Somali Democratic Republic.

== Traditional postage ==
In early 1991, the Somali Postal Service had 100 post offices, with a total staff of between 1,665 and 2,165 personnel. The national postal infrastructure was later completely destroyed during the civil war, with Somali Postal officially suspending operations in October 1991. Residents subsequently had to turn to traditional methods of dispatching parcels and letters. They also communicated via handwritten letters sent through acquaintances and mobile and email messaging services.

Postage stamps continued to be produced illegally internationally during the war, although their subject matter suggests they were designed for external collectors.

== Somali Postal Service ==
In November 2013, international postal services partially resumed. Posts worldwide can send mail to Somalia using Dubai as a hub, following an agreement with the United Arab Emirates and its postal operator, Emirates Post. For 23 years (since 1990), Somalia has been isolated from the international postal community, in the absence of any formal means to send mail there. The Universal Postal Union began assisting the reestablished Somali Postal Service to develop its capacity, including providing technical assistance and hoped to provide some basic mail processing equipment to the Somali Post, including tables, postal bags, postal boxes and delivery tricycles. In 2013, there was only one general post office in the capital and some 25 staff. In October 2014, the Ministry of Posts and Telecommunications also relaunched postal delivery from abroad. The postal system is slated to be implemented throughout the country via a new postal coding and numbering system. This was just for inbound mail from abroad. According to the Minister of Posts and Telecommunications Mohamud Ibrihim Adan, the relaunch's next phase will enable local residents to send letters to acquaintances overseas.

On July 28, 2025, the Ministry of Communications and Technology of the Federal Government of Somalia has officially resumed operations of the national postal service, ending a 36-year suspension. The reactivation took place at Aden Abdulle International Airport. Since May 1, 2025, Somalia has taken over direct management of incoming and outgoing international mail through a mail exchange center in Mogadishu.

At this time, it is yet to be seen what postage stamps will be produced for Somalia. Due to the latest announcements by the Somalia Ministry of Communications and Technology, the validity of all postage stamps in the name of Somalia produced from 1991 to April of 2025 is in question. This is because of multiple statements made by the officials stating that the national postal service of Somalia was in suspension for near 36 years.

== See also ==
- Postage stamps and postal history of British Somaliland
- Postage stamps and postal history of Italian East Africa
- Postage stamps and postal history of Oltre Giuba
- Somali Postal Service
