= Somali Postal Service =

- Boostada Soomaaliya

Agency overview
- Type: Postal service
- Jurisdiction: Federal Government of Somalia
- Headquarters: Mogadishu, Somalia; 2°04′00″N 45°22′00″E
- Parent agency: Ministry of Communications and Technology
- Website: moct.gov.so

The Somali Postal Service (Somali Post) is the national postal service of Somalia. It is part of the Federal Government of Somalia's Ministry of Communications and Technology.

Somali Post operated postal services domestically and internationally, before ceasing operations in 1991.

Somali Post officially relaunched on 1 November 2013, following a memorandum of understanding signed with Emirates Post, the Emirati national postal service, in April 2013.

A postal coding and numbering system for each of Somalia's eighteen administrative regions was developed in October 2014.

== History ==
=== General ===
In early 1991, the Somali Postal Service had 100 post offices, with a total staff of between 1,665 to 2,165 personnel. The national postal infrastructure was later completely destroyed during the civil war, with Somali Postal officially suspending operations in October 1991. Residents subsequently had to turn to traditional methods of dispatching parcels and letters. They also communicated via handwritten letters sent through acquaintances and mobile and email messaging services.

In order to fill the vacuum, a partially reconstituted Somali Post signed an agreement in 2003 with the United Arab Emirates' Emirates Post to process mail to and from Somalia. Emirates Post's mail transit hub at the Dubai International Airport was then for a time used to forward mail from Somalia to the UAE and various Western destinations as well as to route mail destined for the country.

=== Relaunch ===
Concurrently, the Somali Transitional Federal Government began preparations to revive the national postal service. In 2011, a Somali minister approached the Universal Postal Union (UPU) for support in rehabilitating the Somali postal service. The UPU subsequently reached out to other international postal bodies, recommending bilateral cooperation with the Somali authorities. Several countries expressed interest, notably the UAE.

The Somali government's overall reconstruction plan for Somali Post is structured into three phases spread over a period of ten years. Phase I will see the reconstruction of the postal headquarters and General Post Office (GPO), as well as the establishment of sixteen branch offices in the capital and seventeen in regional bases. As of March 2012, the Somali authorities have re-established Somalia's membership with the UPU and taken part once again in the UPU's affairs as well as liaised with other UN agencies. They have also rehabilitated the GPO in Mogadishu, with an initial staff of 25 postal workers ready to handle the mail again. Additionally, the government appointed an official postal consultant to provide professional advice on the renovations. Phase II of the rehabilitation project involves the construction of 718 postal outlets from 2014 to 2016. Phase III is slated to begin in 2017, with the objective of creating 897 postal outlets by 2022.

In December 2012, then Minister of Information, Posts and Telecommunications Abdullahi Elmoge Hersi announced that Somalia's new federal government planned to officially relaunch the Somali Postal Service in 2013. Hersi subsequently signed a memorandum of understanding with Emirates Post President Fahad al Hosani on 22 April 2013, wherein Dubai is to serve as a hub for handling all parcels bound for or leaving Somalia. The UAE authorities also pledged to finance the first year of Somali Post's resumed operations. Mediated by the UPU Director General Bishar A. Hussein, the agreement represented the first step in the Information Ministry's plan to relaunch the national postal service.

In November 2013, international postal services for Somalia officially resumed. The UPU is now assisting the Somali Postal Service to develop its capacity, including providing technical assistance and basic mail processing equipment. In October 2014, the Ministry of Posts and Telecommunications also relaunched postal delivery from abroad. The postal system is slated to be implemented throughout the country via a new postal coding and numbering system. According to the Minister of Posts and Telecommunications Mohamud Ibrihim Adan, the relaunch's next phase will enable local residents to send letters to acquaintances overseas.

== Postal codes ==
As of October 2014, new postal codes have been developed for each of Somalia's eighteen administrative regions. The postal codes are two letters, such as AW for Awdal, BN for Banaadir, BR for Bari and SL for Sool.

Additionally, numbers have been allocated for each of the provinces and their districts.

== Import regulations ==
=== Permit ===
The Somali Postal Service requires addressees within Somalia to have an import permit for all commercial goods.

=== Prohibitions ===
Somali Post bans items on Australia Post's Dangerous and Prohibited Goods & Packaging Post Guide, including alcoholic beverages. Lottery tickets and promotional materials are likewise proscribed.

=== Special documentation ===
In terms of special documentation on imports, Somali Postal Service requires that all incoming commercial goods be identified as commercial. Private packages must also be labeled as private instead of as gift only, personal effects or commercial.

== See also ==
- Postage stamps and postal history of Somalia
- Communications in Somalia
