= Abdirahman Jama Barre =

Somali politician (1937–2017)

Abdirahman Jama Barre عبد الرحمن جامع بري
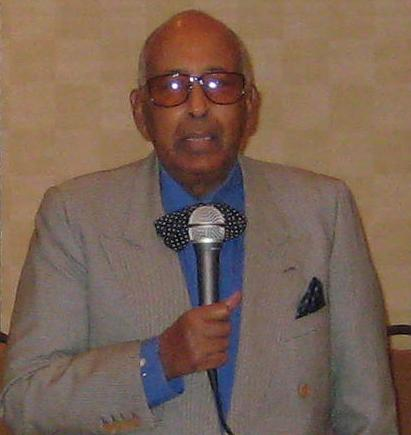

Minister of Finance of the Somali Democratic Republic
- In office December 1987 – April 1989
- Vice President: Muhammad Ali Samatar
- Preceded by: Abdullahi Warsame Nur
- Succeeded by: Mohamed Sheikh Osman

Minister of Foreign Affairs of the Somali Democratic Republic
- In office 1989–1990
- Vice President: Muhammad Ali Samatar

1st Deputy Prime Minister of the Somali Democratic Republic
- In office 1987 – January 1991
- Vice President: Muhammad Ali Samatar
- Preceded by: Office established

Minister of Foreign Affairs of the Somali Democratic Republic
- In office July 27, 1977 – 1987

Personal details
- Born: 1937 Luuq, Italian Somaliland
- Died: 15 August 2017 (aged 79) San Diego, California, United States
- Party: Supreme Revolutionary Council
- Other political affiliations: Somali Revolutionary Socialist Party
- Relations: Mohamed Siad Barre
- Children: 15
- Education: University of Padua

Abdirahman Jama Barre (Somali: Cabdiraxmaan Jaamac Barre, Arabic: عبد الرحمن جامع بري; 1937 – 15 August 2017) was a Somali politician. He twice served as the Minister of Foreign Affairs of the Somali Democratic Republic, also he was the longest serving Minister of Foreign Affairs of Somalia, and later as the Minister of Finance. He was the first Deputy Prime Minister of Somalia.

== Early and Personal life ==
Abdirahman Jama Barre was born in 1937 in the southern town of Luuq, Italian Somaliland. He hails from the Marehan Darod clan. He was a cousin of former President of Somalia, Mohamed Siad Barre. His brother, "Asasey", was also active in Somali politics.

Barre pursued higher studies abroad. For his tertiary education, he earned a PhD in the early 1960s from the teaching faculty at the University of Padua in Padua, Italy. Barre was married, and had seven children. He had eight children from his first marriage. He enjoyed lawn tennis.

== Career ==
Barre began his professional career upon graduation from university. Initially, he briefly served as a headmaster. In 1960, he joined the Ministry of Foreign Affairs of the Somali Republic's early civilian administration. He received his first diplomatic post the same year, working as a counsellor until 1964. Barre was concurrently promoted to Director of the ministry's Economic and Social Department as well as Director-General of its Social Department. He served as such for the next four years. Between 1969 and 1970, he was also the Acting Director-General of both departments.

Following the bloodless 1969 coup d'état, Barre was named Director-General of the Ministry of Foreign Affairs by the new ruling Supreme Revolutionary Council (SRC) in 1970. He subsequently became a member of the Somali Revolutionary Socialist Party (SSRP) in 1976, sitting on the political association's Central Committee.

In July 1977, Barre was appointed Minister of Foreign Affairs. He represented the Somali Democratic Republic in this capacity at the United Nations General Assembly.

Along with then Foreign Minister of Ethiopia Foreign Minister of Ethiopia Goshu Wolde, Jama Barre was also part of a seven-person Somalia-Ethiopia committee. The intergovernmental panel was formed in 1986.

Toward the end of 1987, Barre was appointed the 1st Deputy Prime Minister of Somalia. Abdiqassim Salad Hassan served alongside him as the 2nd Deputy Prime Minister. Jama was concurrently named Minister of Finance and Treasury. In 1989, he was reappointed Foreign Minister, with his second term in the office lasting a year. He would hold both 1st Deputy Prime and Finance Minister positions until the collapse of the central government in January 1991.

Barre was part of the governmental Suhl (Reconciliation) group, of which Abdiqassim Salad Hassan, who would go on to become President of Somalia, was a key founder.

In 2004, following the establishment of the Transitional Federal Government, Barre presented himself as a candidate for President of Somalia. He lost out to then President of the autonomous Puntland region, Abdullahi Yusuf Ahmed.

== See also ==
- Somali Youth League
