= Mustaf Ali Duhulow =

Somali politician

- مصطاف علي دوهولو
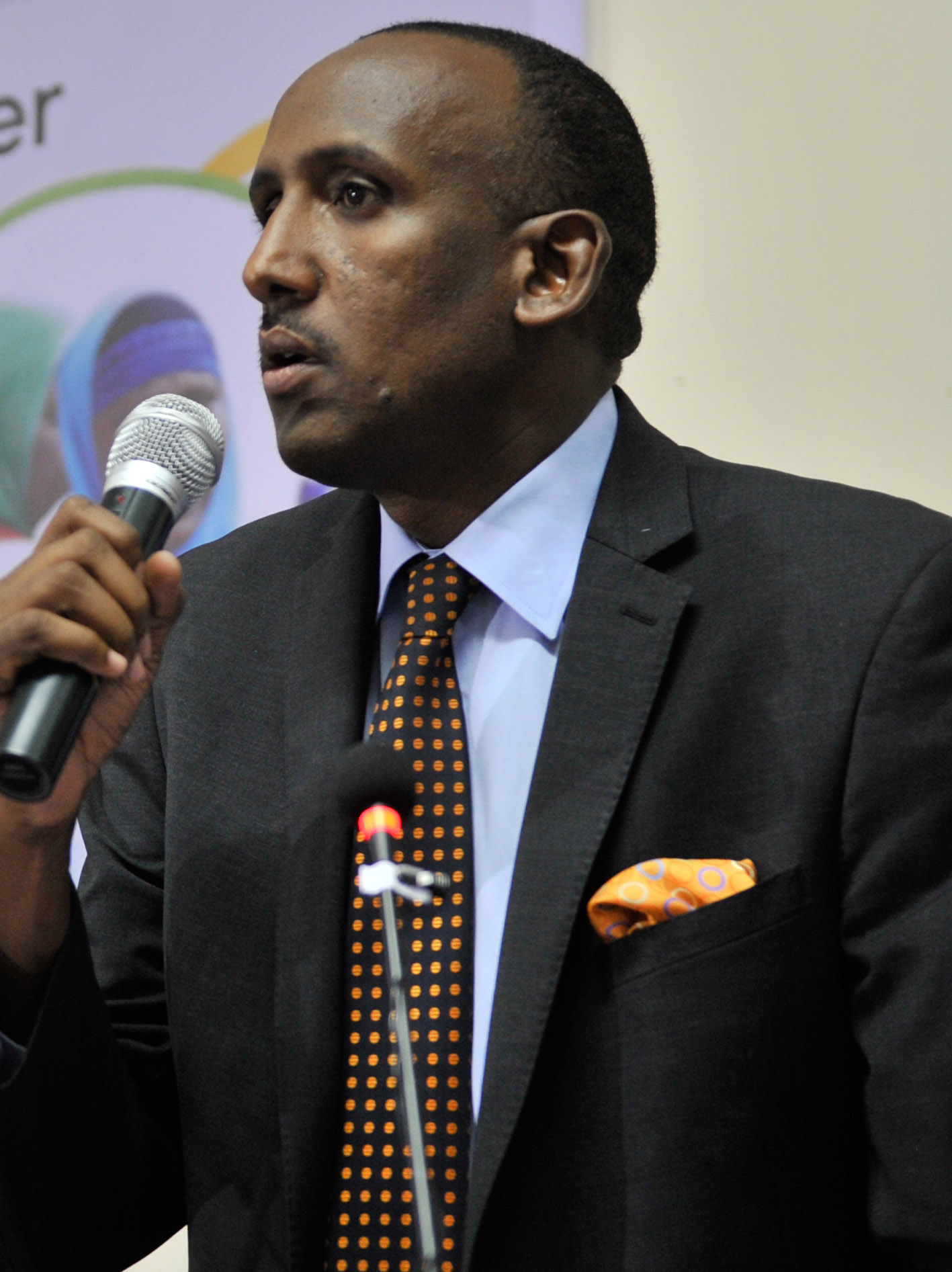

Minister of Information of Somalia
- In office 17 January 2014 – 27 January 2015
- Prime Minister: Abdiweli Sheikh Ahmed
- Preceded by: Abdullahi Elmoge Hersi
- Succeeded by: Guled Hussein Kasim

Personal details
- Born: Somalia

Mustaf Sheikh Ali Duhulow (Somali: Mustafa Shiikh Cali Dhuxuloow, Arabic: مصطاف شيخ علي دوهولو) is a Somali politician. He served as the Minister of Information of Somalia from January 2014 to January 2015.

== Personal life ==
Duhulow hails from the Murusade clan.

== Career ==
=== Federal Parliament ===
In 2004, Duhulow was among the legislators nominated to the newly established Federal Parliament of Somalia.

=== Minister of Information ===
==== Appointment ====
On 17 January 2014, Duhulow was appointed Minister of Information by Prime Minister of Somalia Abdiweli Sheikh Ahmed. He succeeded Abdullahi Elmoge Hersi in the position.

==== Somalia-Ethiopia cooperative agreements ====
In February 2014, Duhulow was part of a Somali government delegation in Addis Ababa led by Prime Minister Abdiweli Sheikh Ahmed, where the visiting officials met with Ethiopian Prime Minister Hailemariam Desalegn to discuss strengthening bilateral relations between Somalia and Ethiopia. The meeting concluded with a tripartite Memorandum of Understanding agreeing to promote partnership and cooperation, including a cooperative agreement signed by Duhulow and the Ethiopian Minister of Government Communication Affairs Redwan Hussein covering information matters, a second cooperative agreement to develop the police force, and a third cooperative agreement on the aviation sector.

==== Media law ====
On 1 September 2014, in a meeting chaired by Prime Minister Abdiweli Sheikh Ahmed, the Federal Cabinet approved a new Draft Media Bill. The legislation was welcomed by the National Union of Somali Journalists and other local media groups, who urged public institutions to adhere to the bill once implemented. Among other clauses, the new law proposes the establishment of an Independent Media Council. According to Minister of Information Duhulow, after having consulted with Somali journalists and directors, the media bill was put before the Federal Parliament for deliberation during its fifth legislative session.

==== Public Awareness Campaign ====
In September 2014, the Somali government also launched a Public Awareness Campaign to tackle and prevent corruption in the public sector and to strengthen good governance. According to the project's director Minister of Information Duhulow, it will consist of anti-corruption programs, which are scheduled to air on radio and television stations, newspapers, websites, social media and various other local media outlets. The initiative will broadcast public service announcements aimed at the average citizen, as well as establish call-in programs, debates, discussions and public events. The minister also indicated that the public awareness campaign would be accompanied by a civic education drive to inform the citizenry on anti-graft legislation, reporting and enforcement.

==== End of term ====
On 27 January 2015, Duholow's term as Minister of Information of Somalia ended, following the appointment of a new Cabinet by Prime Minister Omar Abdirashid Ali Sharmarke. He was succeeded at the position by Guled Hussein Kasim.
