= Abdullahi Ahmed Addow =

Somali politician and diplomat

Abdullahi Ahmed Addow عبد الله أحمد أدو
- Addow in 1986

Somali Ambassador to the United States
- In office 1977–1980

Minister of Finance of Somalia
- In office 1980–1984
- Preceded by: Mohamed Yusuf Weirah
- Succeeded by: Mohamed Sheikh Osman

Somali Ambassador to the United States
- In office 1986–1988

Personal details
- Born: 15 May 1936 (age 90) Brava, Somalia

Abdullahi Ahmed Addow (Somali: Cabdilaahi Axmed Caddoow, Arabic: عبد الله أحمد أدو) is a Somali politician and diplomat.

== Early life ==
Addow was born on 15 May 1936 in Brava, situated in the southeastern Lower Shabelle region of Somalia. He hails from the Habar Gidir sub-clan of the Hawiye.

== Career ==
=== Ambassador and Finance Minister ===
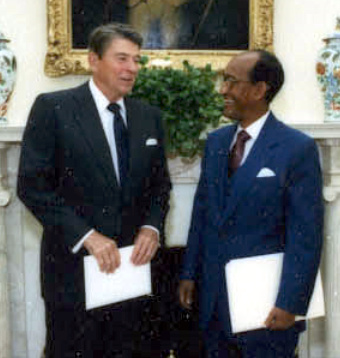
Receiving diplomatic credentials from U.S. President Ronald Reagan in 1986

Between 1970 and 1980 and again from 1986 to 1988, he served as Somalia's Ambassador to the United States. From 1980 to 1984, he was also Minister of Finance of Somalia.

=== Presidential candidate ===
Addow has thrice run for President of Somalia. In 2000, during the Somali peace process held in Arta, Djibouti, he was defeated in the third ballot by the eventual winner, former Interior Minister Abdiqasim Salad Hassan. Addow received 92 votes against Hassan's 145.

In 2004, Addow again for office in that year's presidential elections, losing 189–79 in the third round to former Puntland President, Abdullahi Yusuf Ahmed. In mid-2012, Addow ran once more for president in Somalia's 2012 elections.
