= Ministry of Communications and Technology =

Ministry of Communications and Technology may refer to:

- Ministry of Communications and Technology (Ghana)
- Ministry of Communications and Technology (Somalia)
- Ministry of Communications and Technology (Syria), the ministry that is responsible for developing government communications and information policies and setting strategies and implementation programs in this field
