= Bashir Isse =

Bashir Isse بشير عيسى

Governor of the Central Bank of Somalia
- In office 27 November 2013 – 4 April 2019
- President: Hassan Sheikh Mohamud; Mohamed Abdullahi Farmajo
- Preceded by: Yussur A.F. Abrar
- Succeeded by: Abdirahman Mohamed Abdullahi
- In office 2006–2010
- President: Abdullahi Yusuf Ahmed; Sharif Sheikh Ahmed
- Preceded by: Mohamud Mohamed Uluso

Deputy Governor of the Central Bank of Somalia
- In office 1981–1988
- President: Siad Barre

President of the Commercial and Savings Bank of Somalia
- In office 1976–1981
- President: Siad Barre

Personal details
- Born: Garowe, Puntland, Somalia
- Education: American Century University; University of Nairobi

Bashir Isse (Somali: Bashiir Cisse, Arabic: بشير عيسى), also known as Bashir Issa Ali, is a Somali banker. He previously was the CEO of the Commercial and Savings Bank of Somalia, and as both the Deputy Governor and Governor of the Central Bank of Somalia. As of April 2014, he is the Central Bank's permanent Governor.

== Background ==
=== Personal life ===
For his post-secondary education, Isse studied at the American Century University, where he earned a BA in Business Administration. He later received a Master's of Public Administration from the same institution. Isse also has a degree in Armed Conflict and Peace Studies from the University of Nairobi.

=== Early career ===
Isse is a banker with many years of experience. He began his career in banking in the 1960s and had held a number of top positions.He also worked to regain Somalia's financial system.

Between 1962 and 1968, Isse worked at the Central Bank of Somalia in both commercial and central banking operations. He was later promoted to the monetary authority's Chief Auditor in 1969–70.

From 1971 to 1973, Isse acted as the Deputy Director General of the Somali Commercial Bank, as well as its successor the Commercial and Savings Bank of Somalia.

In 1975, Isse was Head of a national commission tasked with reforming Somalia's financial system and its administration of state-owned firms.

Isse subsequently was the Deputy Director General and then CEO and President of the Commercial Savings Bank of Somalia between 1976 and 1981.

In the 1981-88 period, Isse acted as the Deputy Governor of the Central Bank of Somalia. He helped the then Governor establish and formulate the monetary authority's policies and strategies.

From 2006 to 2010, Isse was Governor of the Central Bank of Somalia during the Transitional Federal Government (TFG) under President Abdullahi Yusuf Ahmed. Isse was largely responsible for re-establishing the Bank after it had closed down during the civil war. He later resigned from the post after disagreements between TFG Finance Minister Sharif Hassan Sheikh Aden and TFG President Sharif Sheikh Ahmed's administration over the printing of new banknotes.

== Central Bank of Somalia ==
On 27 November 2013, Isse was re-appointed on an interim basis as Somalia's Central Bank Governor, following the resignation of his predecessor Yussur A.F. Abrar earlier in the month. According to incumbent Finance Minister Mohamud Hassan Suleiman, Isse's appointment came a day after Federal Government of Somalia President Hassan Sheikh Mohamud met with international donor representatives in Mogadishu to discuss a temporary replacement at the position. The Council of Ministers later endorsed the selection on 28 November. On 24 April 2014, the federal Cabinet approved Isse as the new permanent Governor of the Central Bank of Somalia. Maryan Abdullahi Yusuf was also named his new Deputy Governor.
