= Maryan Abdullahi Yusuf =

Maryan Abdullahi Yusuf ماريان عبد الله يوسف

Deputy Governor of the Central Bank of Somalia
- Incumbent
- Assumed office 24 April 2014
- President: Hassan Sheikh Mohamud

Maryan Abdullahi Yusuf (Somali: Maryan Cabdulaahi Yuusuf, Arabic: ماريان عبد الله يوسف), also known as Maryam Abdullahi Yusuf, is a Somali banker. She is the Deputy Governor of the Central Bank of Somalia, having been appointed to the position on 24 April 2014. She serves under former interim Central Bank Governor Bashir Isse, who was concurrently approved as permanent Governor by the Cabinet.
