= Bihi Egeh =

Minister of Finance of the Federal Government of Somalia

His Excellency Bihi Egeh Biixi Cige بيحي عغي
- Bihi Egeh in August 2026

Minister of Finance of the Federal Government of Somalia
- Incumbent
- Assumed office 9 July 2023
- President: Hassan Sheikh Mohamud
- Prime Minister: Hamza Abdi Barre
- Preceded by: Elmi Mohamud Nur

Member of the House of the People
- Incumbent
- Assumed office 22 December 2016
- Constituency: Hargeisa, Woqooyi Galbeed

Minister of Labour and Social Affairs of the Federal Government of Somalia
- In office 11 August 2022 – 8 July 2023
- Preceded by: Abdiwahab Ugas Khalif
- Succeeded by: Mohamed Elmi Ibrahim

Personal details
- Party: Independent
- Education: St Antony's College, Oxford (MSt Diplomatic Studies, 2018)

Bihi Iman Egeh (Somali: Biixi Iimaan Cige, Arabic: بيحي إيمان عغي) is a Somali politician serving as the current Minister of Finance of the Federal Government of Somalia since July 2023. Under his leadership, Somalia qualified for the Heavily Indebted Poor Countries Initiative completion point on 13 December 2023.

Bihi hails from Hargeisa and is currently serving his second term as a member of the Federal Parliament of Somalia, having first won this seat in the 2016 election.

== Education ==
Bihi holds a Master of Studies in Diplomatic Studies from the University of Oxford, where he studied at St Antony’s College in 2018. He also holds a bachelor’s degree in global studies and international relations from New Generation University College in Addis Ababa.

== Political career ==
Bihi was first elected to the House of the People in December 2016 and retained his seat in November 2021. The African Development Bank's biographical note says that he served as secretary of the parliamentary Foreign Affairs Committee.

While he was Minister of Labour and Social Affairs, the ministry, the International Labour Organization, the Federation of Somali Trade Unions and the Somali Chamber of Commerce and Industry agreed to implement Somalia's first Decent Work Country Programme in June 2023. Bihi represented the government at the signing.

Bihi was appointed minister of finance in July 2023, succeeding Elmi Mohamud Nur. That December, Somalia reached the completion point of the Heavily Indebted Poor Countries Initiative. The IMF and World Bank estimated the resulting debt-service savings at US$4.5 billion; they described the debt-relief process as an effort spanning three administrations. As finance minister, Bihi chairs Somalia's National Anti-Money Laundering Committee.

Political offices
Preceded by Elmi Mohamud Nur	Minister of Finance of Somalia; 2023–present	Incumbent
