= Hussein Abdi Halane =

Somali economist and politician

Hussein Abdi Halane حسين عبدي هالاني

Minister of Finance of Somalia
- In office 17 January 2014 – 27 January 2015
- Prime Minister: Abdiweli Sheikh Ahmed
- Preceded by: Mohamud Hassan Suleiman
- Succeeded by: Mohamud Ibrihim Adan
- In office 2010–2011
- Preceded by: Sharif Hassan Sheikh Aden
- Succeeded by: Abdinasir Mohamed Abdulle

Personal details
- Born: Somalia

Hussein Abdi Halane (Somali: Xuseen Cabdi Xalane, Arabic: حسين عبدي هالاني) is a Somali economist and politician. He twice served as the Minister of Finance of Somalia

== Career ==
=== Early career ===
Halane previously worked many years with the UNHCR. He was also a former East Africa Director for the Save the Children NGO.

On 4 July 2010, after a Cabinet reshuffle, Halane was named Somalia's Minister of Finance by Prime Minister Omar Abdirashid Ali Sharmarke.

Halane was one of only two ministers retained by Sharmarke's successor Mohamed Abdullahi Mohamed. He subsequently served in an enlarged Ministry of Finance and Treasury until Mohamed's resignation as Premier on 19 June 2011, when Halane in turn stepped down from office.

In December 2013, Halane alongside former Transportation Minister Abdiwahid Elmi Gonjeh was reportedly among the leading candidates for Prime Minister of Somalia. The position eventually went to economist Abdiweli Sheikh Ahmed.

=== Minister of Finance ===
==== Appointment ====
On 17 January 2014, new Prime Minister Ahmed re-appointed Halane as Minister of Finance of Somalia.

==== Financial governance committee ====
In February 2014, Halane announced the establishment of a new financial governance committee. The panel is part of an effort by the central authorities to build a more transparent financial system in order to attract additional foreign budget assistance. It will see Somali officials confer with World Bank, International Monetary Fund and African Development Bank representatives, with committee members tasked with providing advice on financial matters.

==== Tax plan ====
In February 2014, Finance Minister Halane announced that the federal government is slated to launch a comprehensive new taxation system. The initiative aims to diversify and increase public revenue by taxing real estate firms, money transfer companies, mobile phone operators, and other major businesses. To this end, Halane began negotiations with local business community executives over tax rates and collection. The taxation plan is intended to domestically raise funds for 50 to 60 percent of forecast government spending, with donor funds covering the remaining expenditure. Additionally, Halane in conjunction with Mogadishu's mayorship was formulating a taxation plan for land sales in the city to accommodate the capital's growing construction sector.

==== Aviation Training Academy ====
In April 2014, Finance Minister Halane participated in a foundation laying ceremony for a new national Aviation Training Academy at the Aden Adde International Airport in Mogadishu. The event was also attended by Prime Minister Abdiweli Sheikh Ahmed, the Minister of Air and Land Transport Said Qorshel and his deputy, the Turkish Ambassador, and the airport's General Manager. Prime Minister Ahmed indicated that the new institution would serve to enhance the capacity of aviation personnel working in Somalia's airports, and would focus training within the country. Additionally, Ahmed visited the site of a modern terminal that is concurrently being built at the Aden Adde International Airport, with funding provided by the Turkish Favori aviation firm. According to Transport Minister Qorshel, construction of the new terminal is scheduled to take six months, and is expected to improve the airport's functionality and operations. He added that his Ministry is also slated to establish other airports on the capital's outskirts. This in turn would serve to reduce congestion at the Aden Adde International Airport, which would then be exclusively used by large aircraft.

==== AfDB and Tunisian development cooperation ====
In May 2014, Halane was part of a high level Somali federal government delegation to the African Development Bank headquarters in Tunis, which was led by Foreign Affairs Minister Abdirahman Duale Beyle. The visiting parties are slated to meet with the AfDB president Donald Kaberuka to discuss implementation of previous reconstruction development plans and financial pledges made to Somalia. They are then scheduled to confer with Tunisian government officials over potential investment programs in Somalia.

==== Public Procurement, Concessions and Disposal Act ====
In May 2014, the federal Cabinet unanimously passed a new Public Procurement, Concessions and Disposal Act, which Finance Minister Halane had tabled. The new law formalizes principles, procedures and decisions with regard to agreements entered into by public institutions, and procurement of goods, services and concessions with public funds. As such, it aims to spur economic development and establish a foundation for transparent financial governance by eliminating mismanagement of public funds, reducing monopolies and promoting competitiveness in the concession procurement process. The Act is expected to regulate the national public financial sector, ameliorate accountability, and ensure that public funds have been utilized in accordance with their intended purpose. Through sound price management of services and commodities, it also aims to strengthen financial governance and institutions by optimizing values on public expenditures. Parliament is now expected to deliberate on the bill for adoption.

==== Somalia-U.S. police development agreement ====
In August 2014, the Somali and U.S. governments reached an agreement in Washington stipulating that the United States would contribute $1.9 million toward security sector reform, development and capacity-building efforts in Somalia. The pact was signed by Finance Minister of Somalia Halane, U.S. Special Representative for Somalia James P. McAnulty, and Deputy Assistant Secretary for the Bureau of International Narcotics and Law Enforcement Affairs (INL) Todd Robinson. It is primarily slated to provide support to the Somali National Police Force's Criminal Investigative Division (CID), with an emphasis on implementing policies, practices and procedures that buttress citizen services and human rights. The INL will fund the initiative.

==== End of term ====
On 27 January 2015, Halane's term as Minister of Finance of Somalia ended, following the appointment of a new Cabinet by Prime Minister Omar Abdirashid Ali Sharmarke. He was succeeded at the position by Mohamud Ibrihim Adan.
