= Yussur A. F. Abrar =

Somali banker and entrepreneur

Yussur A. F. Abrar يسر أبرار

Governor of the Central Bank of Somalia
- In office 13 September 2013 – 1 November 2013
- President: Hassan Sheikh Mohamud
- Preceded by: Abdisalam Omer
- Succeeded by: Bashir Isse

Vice President at Citigroup

Vice President of Credit Risk Management at American International Group

President of Warsun International Communications Corp.

Personal details
- Born: Borama, British Somaliland (now Somaliland)
- Education: Oklahoma State University

Yussur A. F. Abrar (Somali: Yusuur Abraar, Arabic: يسر أبرار) is a Somali banker and entrepreneur. She previously served as Vice-President at Citigroup, as well as Vice-President of Credit Risk Management at the American International Group in New York City. Abrar is also the founder and President of Warsun International Communications Corp. From September to November 2013, she was the Governor of the Central Bank of Somalia.

== Background ==
=== Personal life ===
Abrar was born in the northwestern town of Borama, Somaliland.

She later pursued her post-secondary education in the United States, earning a bachelor's degree from the Oklahoma State University. She also holds an M.B.A. from the same institution.

=== Early career ===
In a professional capacity, Abrar has over three decades of experience in banking, risk management and insurance.

She is the founder and President of Warsun International Communications Corp., a telecommunications company with a focus on internet accessibility. As of 2002, the firm was headquartered in Vienna, Virginia and employed around 50 workers.

Abrar previously also acted as the Vice President at Citigroup. Additionally, she was Vice President of Credit Risk Management at the American International Group (AIG) in New York City, one of the world's largest insurance companies.

Abrar has likewise served as a financial consultant.

== Central Bank of Somalia ==
On 13 September 2013, Abrar was appointed the Governor of the Central Bank of Somalia by incumbent President Hassan Sheikh Mohamud. She succeeded Abdisalam Omer in the position and is the first woman to have been appointed to the post.

Abrar's first announced priorities included revitalizing the national financial system through the issuance of licenses to banks and other financial institutions, collaborating with stakeholders on the remittance market, strengthening the regulation framework to ensure fiscal responsibility and transparency, and instituting monetary policy vis-a-vis job creation to galvanize economic development and growth.

On 1 November 2013, Abrar stepped down from her position as Somalia's Central Bank Governor. In a formal letter of resignation, she cited interference with the bank's functions as among the main reasons for her departure, as well as pressure to sanction deals that she believed were in violation of her fiduciary responsibility as head of the national monetary authority. Abrar was succeeded at the position by Bashir Isse, who was appointed on 27 November 2013.
