= Postage stamps and postal history of British Somaliland =

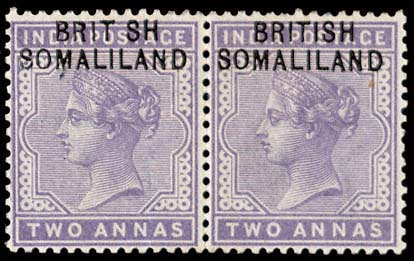
A pair of Indian stamps overprinted for use in Somalia with the 2nd I in BRITISH missing on the left hand stamp

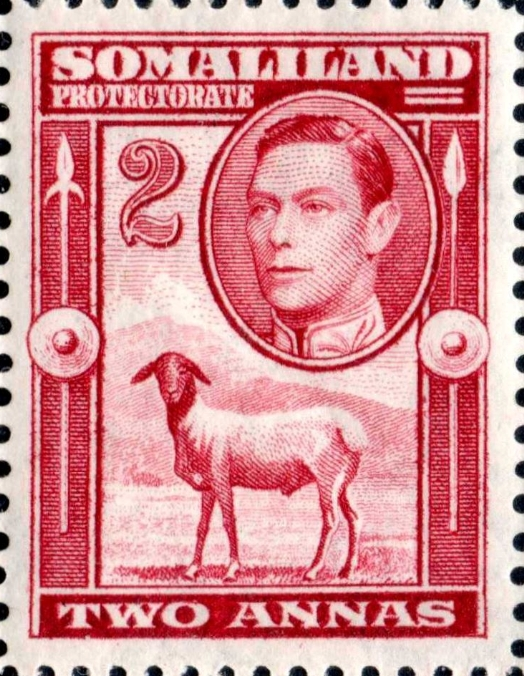
A George VI 2 anna stamp inscribed Somaliland Protectorate

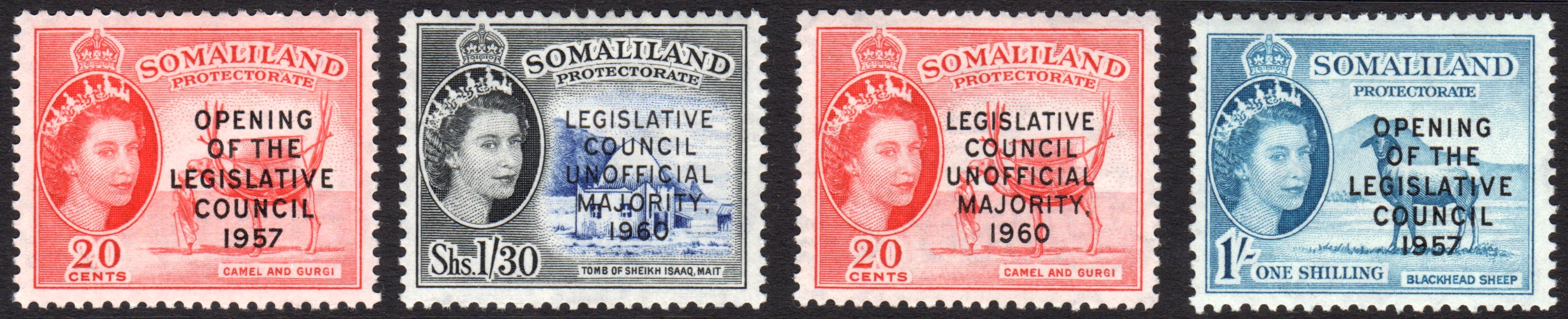
Stamps of the Somaliland Protectorate 1953 issue overprinted in 1957 and 1960 to mark events relating to the Legislative Council

Originally mail from British Somaliland used postage stamps of Egypt, then India. In 1903, about 30 types of stamps of India were overprinted "BRITISH / SOMALILAND".

== First stamps ==
In 1904 the protectorate issued its own stamps, featuring a profile of King Edward VII, and inscribed "SOMALILAND PROTECTORATE". Issues of George V used the same design with George's profile.

== George VI ==
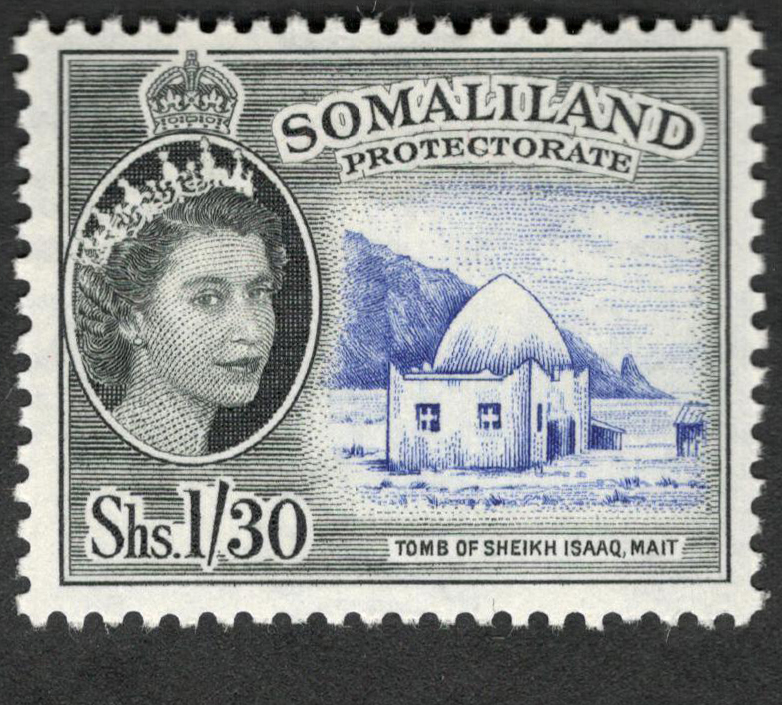
British Somaliland Protectorate stamp featuring the tomb of Sheikh Isaaq at Mait

After George VI ascended the throne, the new series of 12 values used three pictorial designs; a Berbera blackhead sheep, lesser kudu antelope, and a map. The 1938 series included a 3/4 on portrait of the king; in 1942, with the restoration of civil postal service after the Italian occupation, new stamps used a full-face portrait, and the sheep design was re-engraved.

== Change of currency ==
Around 1950 the currency changed from annas and rupees to cents and shillings, and the 1942 stamps were appropriately surcharged. The UPU 75th anniversary issue was printed in cents and shillings, but its issue date was 24 October 1949 (10th Oct. in London), before the changeover, so those stamps had to be surcharged in the old currency.

== Queen Elizabeth II ==
Queen Elizabeth II ushered in a new series featuring a variety of local wildlife and scenes. Some values of these stamps were overprinted in 1957 with "OPENING / OF THE / LEGISLATIVE / COUNCIL / 1957", and in 1960 with "LEGISLATIVE / COUNCIL / UNOFFICIAL / MAJORITY, / 1960" to mark the events as named by the overprints.

All the stamps of British Somaliland were withdrawn from sale on 25 June 1960 as Somaliland obtained independence. For the week prior to formal unification with Italian Somaliland on 1 July, a set of Italian Somaliland stamps overprinted "Somaliland Independence 26 June 1960" was issued.

== See also ==
- Postage stamps and postal history of Somalia
- Revenue stamps of British Somaliland

== References and sources ==
Sources

- Stanley Gibbons Ltd: various catalogues
- Encyclopaedia of Postal Authorities
- Rossiter, Stuart & John Flower. The Stamp Atlas. London: Macdonald, 1986. ISBN 0-356-10862-7
