= Jama Hassan Khalif =

Somalian politician

Minister of Communication and Technology
- In office 2022–2024
- Appointed by: Hamza Abdi Barre
- Succeeded by: Mohamed Adam Moalim

Personal details
- Citizenship: Somalia

Jama Hassan Khalif is a Somalian politician and a former minister of communication and technology. He was appointed in 2022 by the prime minister of Sudan, Hamza Abdi Barre, and in 2024 he was replaced by Mohamed Adam Moalim.

== TikTok, Telegram and 1Xbet ban ==
During Khalif's tenure, he ordered a ban on TikTok, Telegram and 1Xbet apps. He claimed the ban was to curb misinformation and the display of horrific contents on the internet.

== Ambassador tenure ==
Khalif was appointed as the ambassador of Somalia to South Sudan and Niger. He presented his credentials to president Salva Kiir of South Sudan on 20 November 2024 and to president Abdourahamane Tiani of Niger on 15 January 2026. He moreover presented his credentials to President of Burkina Faso Ibrahim Traoré on 25 June 2026.
