= Asha Ahmed Abdalla =

Somali politician

Asha Ahmed Abdalla عائشة أحمد عبد لله
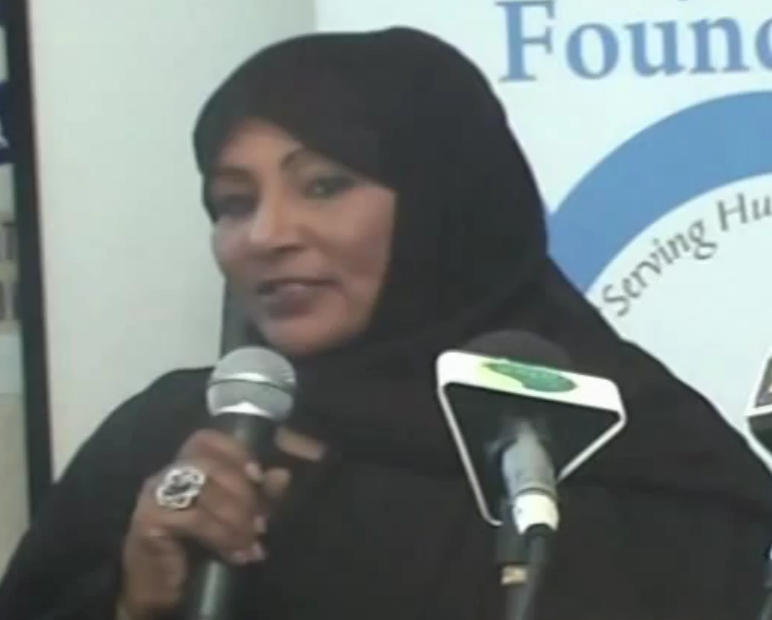

Member of the Transitional Federal Parliament
- In office 2004 – 20 August 2012
- Prime Minister: Abdiweli Mohamed Ali

Personal details
- Born: 1958 (age 67–68) Erigavo, Somalia
- Party: Independent
- Education: LaGuardia Community College

Asha Ahmed Abdalla (Somali: Casha Axmed Cabdalla; Arabic: عائشة أحمد عبد الله; born 1958) is a Somali politician. She was a founding member of the Transitional Federal Parliament, and was the first female run for presidential candidate, Asha is a veteran legislator representing the northern Sanaag constituency.

== Biography ==
Abdalla was born in 1958 in the town of Erigavo, situated in the northern Sanaag region of Somalia. She spent her early childhood in Yemen and returned to Somalia in the late 1960s.

Abdalla later moved to the United States to pursue higher studies, graduating from La Guardia College in New York City. She holds dual Somali and American citizenship.

== Political career ==
In 2000, Abdalla attended the peace conference on Somalia held in Arta, Djibouti. Because of her pivotal role in the talks, she was elected a Member of Parliament (MP) in the Transitional National Government (TNG).

Abdalla was subsequently appointed to various ministerial positions in the TNG. The latter include Minister for Demobilisation, Disarmament, Reintegration and Disabled Care, and Deputy Minister of Labor and Sports.

In 2004, Abdalla was also among the 275 Somalian delegates who convened to form the Transitional Federal Government (TFG) of Somalia.

That same year, she made a run for Somalia's presidency, making her the first woman in the country's history to do so. On account of low votes, Abdalla was eliminated in the first round of the elections, which were held during the peace talks.

She was also a member of the Transitional Federal Parliament (TFP), until the inauguration of the Federal Parliament of Somalia in August 2012.

== Activism ==
Abdalla has participated in numerous conferences on community development, peace building and humanitarianism. As the head of the Somali Women's Parliamentarian Association, she travels globally to promote stability and civil society forums, particularly women's issues. Her campaign slogan is "Give Somalia a Mother’s Nurturing", and empowering women stands at number 10 in her 12-point agenda for the country.

In addition, Abdalla is the founder of the Community Sustaining Development Organization, an initiative committed to assisting in post-conflict rehabilitation efforts through humanitarian services and developmental activities.

In 2011, Abdalla was also among several female political activists selected to participate in the Nobel Peace Prize multi-national panel Women’s Political Leadership: In peace and conflict.
