= Ministry of Finance (Somalia) =

Government ministry of Somalia

Coordinates: 2°2′24″N 45°20′46″E

Federal Republic of Somalia Ministry of Finance
- Wasaaradda Maaliyadda
- Coat of arms of Somalia

Agency overview
- Formed: 31 August 1960; 65 years ago
- Jurisdiction: Government of Somalia
- Headquarters: Bondhere, Mogadishu, Banaadir (Somalia)
- Agency executive: Bihi Egeh, Minister
- Parent agency: Cabinet of Somalia
- Website: www.mof.gov.so

The Ministry of Finance (Somali: Wasaaradda Maaliyadda), abbreviated MOF, is a ministry of the Government of Somalia that is charged with the responsibility for government expenditure and revenue raising. The ministry's role is to develop economic policy and prepare the federal budget. The Ministry of Finance also oversees financial legislation and regulation. Each year in October, the Minister of Finance presents the Somali federal budget to the Parliament.

== Minister ==
The Minister of Finance administers his functions through the Ministry of Finance and a range of other government agencies. The current Minister of Finance is Bihi Egeh

The Minister of Finance is the minister in charge of government revenue and expenditure. The minister oversees economic policy: fiscal policy is within the minister's direct responsibility, while monetary policy is implemented by the politically independent Central Bank of Somalia, the head of which is appointed by the President of Somalia. The Minister of Finance also oversees financial legislation and regulation. Each year in October, the Minister of Finance presents Somalia's federal budget to Parliament.

The Minister of Finance is a very senior government post; historically, many finance ministers have previously, concurrently or subsequently served as prime minister or deputy prime minister.

=== Ministers of Finance ===
- Salad Abdi Mohamed, 1956–1959
- Osman Ahmed Roble, 1959–1960
- Abdulkadir Mohamed Aden, 1960–1964
- Awil Haji Abdullahi Farah, 1964–1966
- Ali Omar Shego, 1966–1969
- Sufi Omar Mohamed, May–October 1969
- Mohamed Abdi Arrale, 1969–1970
- Ibrahim Megag Samatar, 1970–1971
- Mohamed Yusuf Weirah, 1971–1974
- Abdirahman Noor Hersi, 1974–1978
- Mohamed Yusuf Weirah, 1978–1980
- Abdullahi Ahmed Addow, 1980–1984
- Mohamed Sheikh Osman, 1984–1987
- Abdullahi Warsame Nur, February–December 1987
- Abdirahman Jama Barre, December 1987 – April 1989
- Mohamed Sheikh Osman, April 1989 – February 1990
- Mohamed Gelle Yusuf, 1990–1991
- Sayid Sheikh Dahir, 2000–2002
- Hussein Mahmud Sheikh Hussein, 2002–2006
- Hasan Muhammad Nur Shatigadud, 2006–2007
- Muhammad Yusuf Weyrah, 2007-2008
- Muhammad Ali Hamud, 2008–2009
- Sharif Hassan Sheikh Aden, 2009–2010
- Hussein Abdi Halane, 2010–2011
- Abdinasir Mohamed Abdulle, 2011–2012
- Mohamud Hassan Suleiman, November 2012 – January 2014
- Mohamed Rashid Sheikh Mohamed, September 2012 – December 2013
- Hussein Abdi Halane, 2014–2015
- Mohamud Ibrihim Adan, January 2015 – March 2017
- Abdirahman Duale Beyle, March 2017 – August 2022
- Elmi Mohamud Nur, August 2022 – 12 July 2023
- Bihi Egeh, 12 July 2023 – present

== History ==
In May 2013, the Somali federal government announced that it had launched a new Public Finance Management Policy (PFMP) in order to streamline the public sector's financial system and to strengthen the delivery capacity of the government's financial sector. Endorsed by the Somali Council of Ministers on May 2, the reform plan has a robust fiduciary framework according to the African Development Bank (AfDB). It is intended to serve as a benchmark for public financial management and the re-establishment of national institutions. The PFMP aims to provide transparent, accurate and timely public sector financial information by ameliorating the national budget process' openness, rendering more efficient and effective public spending, and improving fiscal discipline via both internal and external control. It also sets out to concentrate public expenditure on government priority areas. According to Cabinet members, the policy will cost an estimated $26 million and is expected to be fully implemented over the next four years.

On 17 January 2014, newly appointed Prime Minister of Somalia, Abdiweli Sheikh Ahmed split the ministerial portfolio into Ministry of Finance and Ministry of Planning, respectively.

In February 2014, Minister of Finance Hussein Abdi Halane announced the establishment of a new financial governance committee. The panel is part of an effort by the central authorities to build a more transparent financial system in order to attract additional foreign budget assistance. It will see Somali officials confer with World Bank, International Monetary Fund and African Development Bank representatives, with committee members tasked with providing advice on financial matters. On 29 March 2014, during a parliamentary session, Speaker of the Federal Parliament Mohamed Osman Jawari also announced that all withdrawals from the Central Bank would as of 1 April 2014 require the written approval of the parliamentary finance committee.

In November 2014, the Ministry of Finance launched a new automated Somalia Financial Management Information System (SFMIS) in place of its former manual system. The SFMIS will support reforms made through the Public Finance Management Policy. It aims to strengthen administrative transparency in terms of asset recovery, contracts, concessions and other transactions, and to ameliorate the accuracy, comprehensiveness and timeliness of monetary reports in order to facilitate decision-making. In particular, the system will be centered on registering budget, revenue and expense related data. Electronic financial reports are also slated to be made available through the ministry's official website. The SFMIS' robust IT infrastructure will be installed in all of the Ministry of Finance's offices, as well as in major governmental agencies and partner institutions. Its implementation is funded by the World Bank, and is scheduled to be fully operational in January 2015.

In September 2015, the Ministry of Finance contracted Smart General Services, Ltd., to collect road taxes and vehicle registration fees on behalf of the Federal Government. Despite a standing Government directive that all State revenue be routed to the Treasury Single Account at the Central Bank of Somalia, the taxes and fees generated by Smart General Services were deposited into a private account at Salaam Somali Bank in Mogadishu. The net revenue, once the company had deducted its 40 per cent share, was intended to be transferred from Salaam Somali Bank to the Treasury Single Account every 15 days. The UN Somalia and Eritrea Monitoring Group found that, instead, only $62,648 (4.2 per cent) of the $1,481,695 generated by Smart General Services from August 2016 to May 2017 was ever transferred to the Treasury Single Account. Moreover, revenue was transferred inconsistently and with irregularities. There were public accusations in August 2016 that "Fargetti", the Minister at the time, had embezzled large sums from the tax receipts.

== Structure ==
- Director-General
- Under the Authority of Director-General
  - National Strategy Unit
  - Legal Division
  - Corporate Strategy and Communications Division
  - Treasury Internal Audit Division
  - Integrity Unit
  - Administration Division
  - Human resources Division
- Deputy Director-General (Policy)
  - National Budget Office
  - International Division
  - Fiscal and Economics Division
  - Tax Division
  - Registrar Office of Credit Reporting Agencies
- Deputy Secretary-General (Management)
  - Management Division
  - Government Procurement Division
  - Information Technology Division
- Deputy Director-General (Investment)
  - Strategic Investment Division
  - Statutory Body Strategic Management Division
  - Government Investment Companies Division
  - Public Asset Management Division
- Accountant General
  - Treasury
  - Customs Department

== See also ==
- Central Bank of Somalia
