= Postage stamps and postal history of Oltre Giuba =

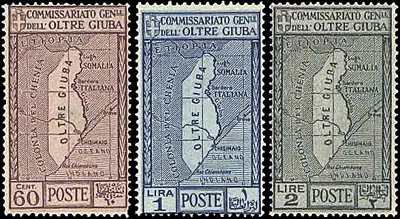
Trans-Juba postage stamps of 1926

Oltre Giuba (Italian for Beyond Juba, Somali: Dadw Jubba) formerly Trans-Juba, is the former name of Jubaland, in the southwesternmost part of Somalia, on the far side of the Juba River (thus "Trans"-Juba), bordering Kenya.

Italian Trans-Juba was established in 1924, after Britain ceded the northern portion of the Jubaland region to Italy as a reward for the Italians having joined the Allies in World War I.

== Overview ==
Italy issued its first postage stamps for Jubaland on July 29, 1925, consisting of contemporary Italian stamps overprinted Oltre Giuba (Trans-Juba).

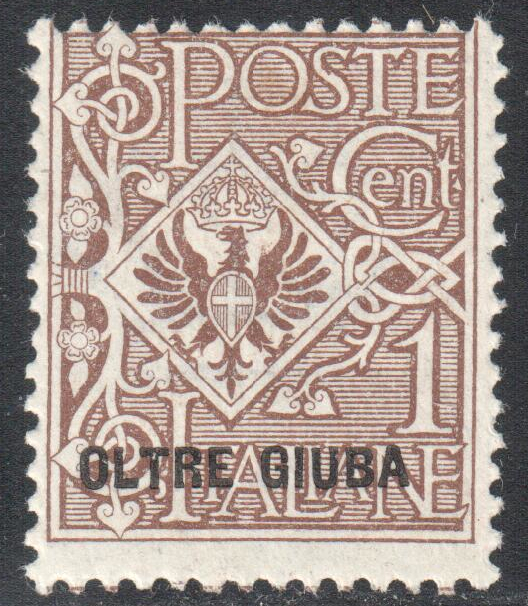
Trans-Juba postage stamps of 1925

The same process was followed for the Italian commemorative issues of the time – the Victor Emmanuel issue, the St. Francis issue. On April 21, 1926, Italy issued a set of seven stamps printed specifically for the colony, depicting a map of the territory and inscribed Commissariato Gen[era]le dell'Oltre Giuba, then on June 1 the omnibus "Colonial Institute issue" included a set inscribed Oltre Giuba.

Only a couple of the higher values have more than a minimal price for collectors, although as usual for remote colonies of brief existence, genuine usages on cover are seldom seen.

Oltre Giuba was then incorporated into neighboring Italian Somaliland on 30 June 1926. The colony had a total area of 87,000 km2 (33,000 sq mi), and in 1926, a population of 120,000 inhabitants.

Italian Jubaland issued express stamps, postage due stamps, parcel stamps, and postal transfer stamps. A total of 12 express stamps, 10 postage due stamps, 13 parcel stamps, and 6 postal transfer stamps were issued from 1925 to 1926.

== See also ==
- Postage stamps and postal history of Somalia

== Bibliography ==
- Bianchi, Paolo. Storia dei servizi postali della Somalia Italiana dalle origini al 1941: con catalogo dei francobolli degli annullamenti = The postal history of Italian Somaliland to 1941, with a catalogue of the cancellations. Vignola: Edizioni Vaccari, 1992 ISBN 88-85335-04-7
- Rossiter, Stuart & John Flower. The Stamp Atlas. London: Macdonald, 1986, p. 275. ISBN 0-356-10862-7
