= Revenue stamps of British Somaliland =

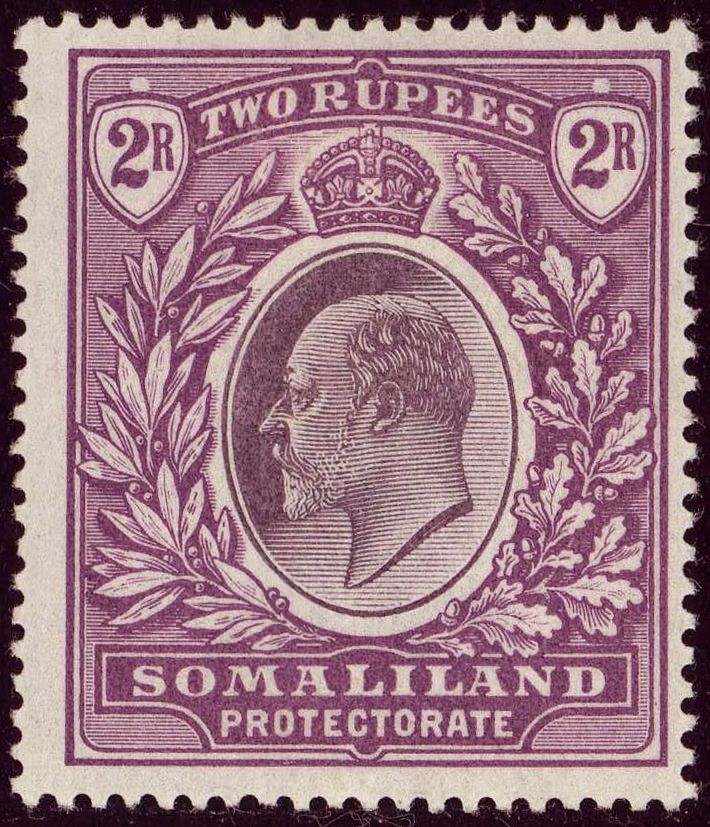

British Somaliland, a British protectorate in present-day Somaliland, issued adhesive revenue or fiscal stamps between 1900 and 1904. All Somaliland fiscals were revenue stamps of India overprinted BRITISH SOMALILAND.

British India Court Fee stamps bearing the portrait of Queen Victoria (originally issued in 1882) were overprinted for use in Somaliland between 1900 and 1903. There are different types of the overprint, and one surcharged stamp is also known. In 1904, similar overprints were applied to Court Fee stamps depicting the new monarch Edward VII.

British India revenue stamps, also depicting Queen Victoria and originally issued in 1869, were also similarly overprinted. Once again there are two different types of overprints.

Somaliland revenues were withdrawn in 1904, following the introduction of dual-purpose postage and revenue stamps.

== See also ==
- Postage stamps and postal history of British Somaliland
