= Ministry of Information (Somalia) =

Government ministry of Somalia

Coordinates: 2°2′24″N 45°20′46″E

Federal Republic of Somalia Ministry of Information
- Coat of arms of Somalia

Agency overview
- Jurisdiction: Somalia
- Headquarters: Bondhere, Banaadir, Mogadishu (Somalia)
- Agency executive: Abdullahi Elmoge Hersi, Minister
- Website: Official website

Ministry of Information, Posts and Telecommunication is the ministry that was responsible for governmental communication in Somalia.

== History ==
Prior to Somali independence, Afqarshe, from Xudun, served as the communications minister for the Qusuusi in the Darwiish. The first Minister of Information post-independence was Yusuf Bowkah.

From the 2000s until 2014, this ministry also oversaw the local telecommunication industry and the Somali Postal Service. On 17 January 2014, newly appointed Prime Minister of Somalia, Abdiweli Sheikh Ahmed split the ministerial portfolio into Ministry of Post and Telecommunications and Ministry of Information, respectively.

In 2017, Abdirahman Abdi Osman took the position of Minister of Information.
