= Somali Civil Aviation Authority =

National aviation governing body

Somali Aviation and Meteorology Authority
- The official SCAA logo

Agency overview
- Jurisdiction: Somalia
- Headquarters: Mogadishu
- Minister responsible: Minister of Transport and Civil Aviation
- Agency executive: Ahmed Moallim Hassan, Director General
- Website: scaa.gov.so

The Somali Civil Aviation Authority (SCAA) (previously: Somali Civil Aviation and Meteorology Authority (SCAMA)) is the national civil aviation authority body of Somalia. Based at the Aden Adde International Airport in the capital Mogadishu, it is under the aegis of the federal Ministry of Air and Land Transport. In 2012, the ministry along with the Somali Civil Aviation Steering Committee set a three-year window for reconstruction of the national civil aviation capacity. After a long period of management by the Civil Aviation Caretaker Authority for Somalia (CACAS), SCAMA in conjunction with the International Civil Aviation Organization also finalized a process in 2014 to transfer control of Somalia airspace to the new Air Space Management Centre in the capital.

== History ==
=== CACAS ===
Prior to collapse of the central government with the outbreak of the civil war in 1991, the Somali Civil Aviation Authority oversaw Somalia's airspace. The UN's Civil Aviation Caretaker Authority for Somalia (CACAS) since then collected over-flight revenues on behalf of the country, reinvesting the proceeds into air traffic control and airport maintenance.

=== Transitional period ===
In 2002, the newly formed Transitional National Government (TNG) briefly reassumed control of Somalia's airspace with the re-establishment of the Somali Civil Aviation Authority by the Ministry of Air and Land Transport.

With the creation of the TNG's successor the Transitional Federal Government (TFG) in 2004, the reconstituted central government of Somalia resumed formal preparations in 2011 to transfer supervision of the country's airspace from the Nairobi-based CACAS to its aviation ministry. After reassuming control of the Somali capital Mogadishu in mid-2011, the TFG also on a contractual basis delegated airport maintenance and operation duties at the Aden Adde International Airport to the Dubai-based SKA Air and Logistics, a private firm specializing in conflict zones.

In April 2012, former Somali Airlines pilots, Abikar Nur and Ahmed Elmi Gure, met with aviation officials at the Lufthansa Flight Training Center in Phoenix, United States, to discuss the possibility of resuming the historic working relationship between Somali Airlines and Lufthansa. The meeting ended with a pledge by the school's chairman, Captain Matthias Kippenberg, to assist the Somali aviation authorities in training prospective pilots.

In July 2012, Mohammed Osman Ali (Dhagah-tur), the General Director of the Ministry of Aviation and Transport, announced that the Somali government had begun preparations to revive the national carrier, Somali Airlines. The Somali authorities along with the Somali Civil Aviation Steering Committee (SCASC) -- a joint commission composed of officials from Somalia's federal and regional governments as well as members of the CACAS, ICAO/TCB and UNDP—convened with international aviation groups in Montreal to request support for the ongoing rehabilitation efforts. The SCASC set a three-year window for reconstruction of the national civil aviation capacity. It also requested the complete transfer of Somali civil aviation operations and assets from the CACAS caretaker body to the Somali authorities.

=== Developments since 2012 ===
In December 2017, the Somali government resumed control of its airspace for the first time in 27 years. Management responsibilities were formally handed over to the Somali Civil Aviation Authority (SCAA), based in Mogadishu, marking a significant milestone in regaining national sovereignty over aviation operations.

In January 2023, Somalia's airspace was officially upgraded to Class A for the first time in nearly three decades. The Somali Civil Aviation Authority began direct management of the Mogadishu Flight Information Region (FIR) at this level, following consultation and approval from the International Civil Aviation Organization (ICAO).

In 2024, the first Maintenance, Repair, and Overhaul (MRO) facility since the early 1990s was opened at Aden Adde International Airport. The facility, supervised by the SCAA, will provide maintenance capabilities for Somali carriers and visiting international operators.

Later in that year, the government also established the Gamtecs Aviation Academy in Mogadishu. The Somali Civil Aviation Authority regulates such companies. The academy operates a small training fleet of two helicopters and two Cessna aircraft, and provides instruction to both civilian and military pilots. In partnership with an Italian aviation academy, Somali cadet pilots trained at Gamtecs were selected for further advanced licensing programs abroad. These included CPL, ATPL, and type rating qualifications, enhancing the local aviation workforce.

=== Somalia aligns with global aviation security standards ===
In March 2025, the Federal Government of Somalia mandated that all international airlines operating within the country submit Advanced Passenger Information (API) and Passenger Name Record (PNR) data. Effective from March 31, the directive aims to improve border security and address threats such as terrorism and transnational crime. It aligns with Somalia’s Immigration Act No. 9 of 1966 as well as United Nations Security Council Resolutions 2178 and 2396. The adoption of this policy enhances Somalia's ability to screen passengers and monitor individuals entering the country more effectively.

In June 2025, Somalia launched a real-time aviation data-sharing system in collaboration with the United States and Interpol. The system enabled the Somali Civil Aviation Authority (SCAA) to access the I-24/7 network, facilitating the exchange of security alerts and passenger information with 195 countries. The initiative was implemented under the framework of Somalia’s aviation security reforms, with support from the United States Embassy in Somalia.

In July 2025, the Somali Civil Aviation Authority (SCAA) signed seven major international aviation security conventions, strengthening Somalia's alignment with global aviation safety standards set by the International Civil Aviation Organization (ICAO). The agreements are aimed at criminalizing offenses related to aircraft hijacking, sabotage, violence at airports, and the use of aircraft as weapons.

The signed conventions include the Tokyo Convention, Montreal Protocol Amending Tokyo Convention (2014), Hague Convention, Convention for the Suppression of Unlawful Acts against the Safety of Civil Aviation, Montreal Protocol on Violence at Airpors(1988), Beijing Protocol Supplementing Hague Convention (2010), and the Beijing Convention. These treaties address a range of threats to civil aviation, including unruly passenger behavior, attacks on aircraft and airports and acts of terrorism.

Following the ratification of seven international aviation security treaties in 2025, Somalia gained the legal authority to enforce penalties against aviation-related offenses. The ratification was regarded as a development in strengthening aviation governance and aligning the country with international standards. However, Somalia has not yet signed the Convention on the Marking of Plastic Explosives for the Purpose of Detection ye.

== Control of airspace ==
After meeting with CACAS representatives, Abdullahi Elmoge Hersi, Somalia's then Minister of Information, Posts and Telecommunications, announced in May 2013 that the Somali federal government would reassume control of the country's airspace by December 31. In preparation for the transition, staff within Somalia were receiving training, with over 100 airspace personnel scheduled to be transferred to Mogadishu for management duties.

In June 2014, Minister of Air Transportation and Civil Aviation Said Jama Qorshel announced that the decision to transfer management of Somalia's air space to the federal government had been finalized, following a meeting between himself and International Civil Aviation Organization (ICAO) representatives in Montreal. He indicated that the officials had agreed to relocate all of the necessary equipment to the new Air Space Management Centre in Mogadishu, technology that ICAO had previously operated on the Somali Civil Aviation Authority's behalf. Additionally, Qorshel stated that the planning stage of the transfer process would soon conclude, and trained Somali technicians would thereafter assume their aviation duties in the capital. He also said that modern aviation equipment had already been imported from Italy, and that additional up-to-date technology earmarked for the Aden Adde International Airport in Mogadishu would be delivered.

On 17 December 2014, Transport Minister Qorshel announced that the Somali government had regained control of its airspace after reaching an agreement with the International Civil Aviation Organization. The minister also indicated that Somalia's airspace would be managed from the capital Mogadishu, and additional professionals would be trained for the purpose.

On January 26, 2023, Somali national airspace regained its Class A classification issued by the International Civil Aviation Organization. The Somali government welcomed the reclassification, with the Minister of Transport and Civil Aviation tweeting, "We are pleased to welcome the reclassification of airspace over Somalia to Class A and the operational restoration of air traffic control services after 30 years."

== See also ==
- List of civil aviation authorities
- Civil Aviation Caretaker Authority for Somalia
