= Mohamed Adam Moalim =

Somalian Minister of Communication and Technology

Mohamed Adam Moalim Ali
- محمد آدم معلم علي

Ministry of Communications and Technology (Somalia)
- Incumbent
- Assumed office April 17, 2024
- Appointed by: Hamza Abdi Barre
- Prime Minister: Hamza Abdi Barre
- Minister: Communications and Technology

Personal details
- Citizenship: Somalia
- Education: MAHSA University

Mohamed Adam Moalim Ali is a Somalian, a member of the Federal Parliament of Somalia and the current minister of Communications and Technology.

== Education ==
Ali obtained his master's degree in Business Administration at MAHSA University.

== Ministerial appointments ==
Ali has served as Minister of Livestock, Forestry & Range and Minister of Public Works, Reconstruction & Housing. On April 17, 2024, he was appointed as the Minister of Communication and Technology.
