= Abdullahi Elmoge Hersi =

Somali politician

Abdullahi Elmoge Hersi عبد الله إلموجآه حرسي

Minister of Information, Posts and Telecommunication of Somalia and Transportation.
- In office 4 November 2012 – 17 January 2014
- Prime Minister: Abdi Farah Shirdon
- Succeeded by: Mohamud Ibrihim Adan

Personal details
- Born: Somalia
- Party: Independent

Abdullahi Elmoge Hersi (Somali: Cabdullaahi Ceelmooge Xirsii, Arabic: عبد الله إلموجآه حرسي) is a Somali politician. He served as the Minister of Information, Posts and Telecommunication of Somalia from November 2012 to January 2014.

== Career ==
=== Appointment ===
On 4 November 2012, Hirsi was named Information Minister of Somalia by Prime Minister Abdi Farah Shirdon.

=== Somali Postal Service ===
In December 2012, Hirsi announced that Somalia's new Federal Government planned to officially relaunch the Somali Postal Service in 2013. Hirsi subsequently signed a Memorandum of Understanding with Emirates Post President Fahad al Hosani on 22 April 2013, wherein Dubai is to serve as a hub for handling all parcels bound for or leaving Somalia. The UAE authorities also pledged to finance the first year of Somali Post's resumed operations. Mediated by the UPU Director General Bishar A. Hussein, the agreement represents the first step in the Information Ministry's plan to relaunch the national postal service.

On 1 November 2013, international postal services for Somalia officially resumed. The UPU is now assisting the Somali Postal Service to develop its capacity, including providing technical assistance and basic mail processing equipment.

=== Somali Civil Aviation Authority ===
After meeting with CACAS representatives, Abdullahi Elmoge Hersi, Somalia's Minister of Information, Posts and Telecommunications, announced in May 2013 that the Somali federal government would reassume control of the country's airspace by 31 December. In preparation for the transition, staff within the Somali Civil Aviation Authority are set to receive training during the rest of the year. Over 100 airspace personnel are also scheduled to be transferred to Mogadishu for management duties.

=== End of term ===
On 17 January 2014, Hersi's term as Minister of Posts and Telecommunications of Somalia ended. New Prime Minister Abdiweli Sheikh Ahmed appointed Mohamud Ibrihim Adan as his replacement to the position.
