= Said Qorshel =

Somali politician

Said Jama Korshel سعيد جامع محمد
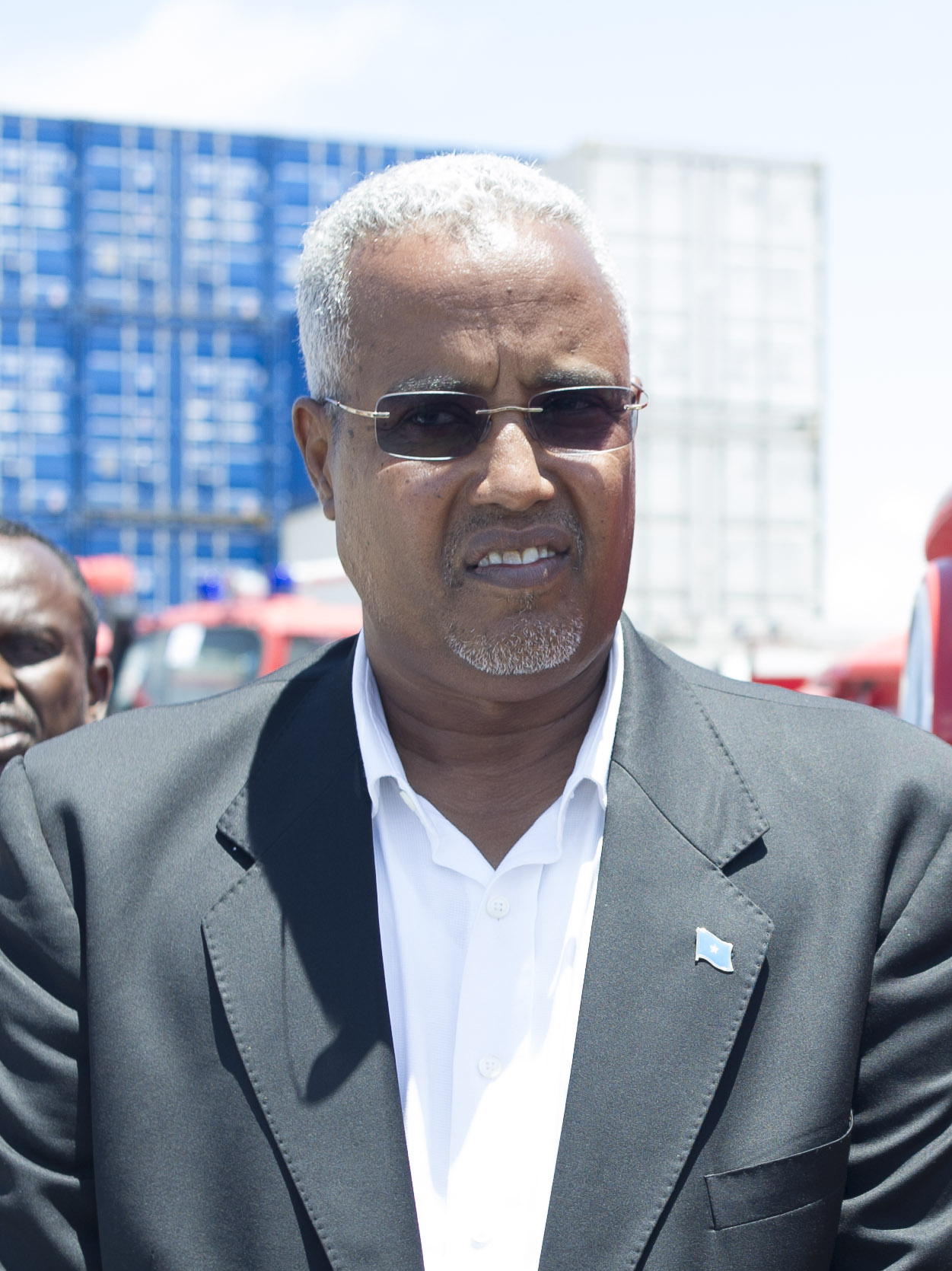

Minister of Air and Land Transport of Somalia
- In office 17 January 2014 – 27 January 2015
- Prime Minister: Abdiweli Sheikh Ahmed
- Succeeded by: Ali Ahmed Jama Jangali

Personal details
- Party: Independent

Said Jama korshel (Somali: Saciid Jaamac Qoorshel, Arabic: سعيد جامع محمد), also known as Said Qorshel, is a Somali politician. He served as the Minister of Air and Land Transport of Somalia from January 2014 to January 2015.

== Personal life ==
Korshel hails from the sanaag region of Somalia. He is the son of the late General Jama Ali Korshel, the former Head of the Somali Police Force in the Somali Democratic Republic.

Korshel belongs to the Warsangali Harti Darod clan.

== Minister of Air and Land Transport ==
=== Appointment ===
On 17 January 2014, Mohamed was appointed Minister of Air and Land Transport by Prime Minister of Somalia Abdiweli Sheikh Ahmed.

=== Somalia-Ethiopia cooperative agreements ===
In February 2014, Mohamed was part of a Somali government delegation in Addis Ababa led by Prime Minister Abdiweli Sheikh Ahmed, where the visiting officials met with Ethiopian Prime Minister Hailemariam Desalegn to discuss strengthening bilateral relations between Somalia and Ethiopia. The meeting concluded with a tripartite Memorandum of Understanding agreeing to promote partnership and cooperation, including a cooperative agreement signed by Mohamed and the Ethiopian Minister of Transport Workneh Gebeyehu covering aviation matters, a second cooperative agreement to develop the police force, and a third cooperative agreement on the information sector.

=== Aviation Training Academy ===
In April 2014, Transport Minister Mohamed along with his deputy participated in a foundation laying ceremony for a new national Aviation Training Academy at the Aden Adde International Airport in Mogadishu. The event was also attended by Prime Minister Abdiweli Sheikh Ahmed, the Minister of Finance Hussein Abdi Halane, the Turkish Ambassador, and the airport's General Manager. Prime Minister Ahmed indicated that the new institution would serve to enhance the capacity of aviation personnel working in Somalia's airports, and would focus training within the country. Additionally, Ahmed visited the site of a modern terminal that is concurrently being built at the Aden Adde International Airport, with funding provided by the Turkish Favori aviation firm. According to Transport Minister Mohamed, construction of the new terminal is scheduled to take six months, and is expected to improve the airport's functionality and operations. He added that his Ministry is also slated to establish other airports on the capital's outskirts. This in turn would serve to reduce congestion at the Aden Adde International Airport, which would then be exclusively used by large aircraft.

=== Meteorological institute ===
In April 2014, Transport Minister Mohamed participated in a foundation laying ceremony for the reconstruction of the former meteorological school in Mogadishu. The institution had closed down in the early 1990s, following the start of the civil war. The event was also attended by Prime Minister Abdiweli Sheikh Ahmed and the Turkish Ambassador to Somalia Kani Touram. Ahmed hailed the school's relaunch as an opportunity for Somali nationals to receive the requisite training in their home country rather than abroad.

=== Somali Civil Aviation Authority ===
In June 2014, Minister of Air Transportation and Civil Aviation Mohamed announced that the decision to transfer management of Somalia's air space to the federal government had been finalized, following a meeting between himself and International Civil Aviation Organization (ICAO) representatives in Montreal. He indicated that the officials had agreed to relocate all of the necessary equipment to the new Air Space Management Centre in Mogadishu, technology that ICAO had previously operated on the Somali Civil Aviation Authority (SOMCAA)'s behalf. Additionally, Mohamed stated that the planning stage of the transfer process would soon conclude, and trained Somali technicians would thereafter assume their aviation duties in the capital. He also said that modern aviation equipment had already been imported from Italy, and that additional up-to-date technology earmarked for the Aden Adde International Airport in Mogadishu would be delivered.

On 17 December 2014, Mohamed announced that the Somali federal government had regained control of its airspace after reaching an agreement with the International Civil Aviation Organization. He also indicated that Somalia's airspace would be managed from the capital Mogadishu, and additional professionals would be trained for the purpose.

=== Air transport reform ===
In November 2014, Mohamed met in Nairobi with the Minister of Transport and Infrastructure of Kenya Michael Kamau to discuss bilateral cooperation in the transportation sector. Among the broached areas were direct air flights from Mogadishu to Nairobi, without a stopover at the Wajir Airport. The two ministers also agreed to form a joint committee to investigate allegations of extortion by officials at the facility.

=== Port of Mogadishu ===
In November 2014, Mohamed launched a new transportation reform initiative at the Port of Mogadishu. The minister met with local transportation union officials to discuss how to optimize the new system's implementation, ensure its transparency and accountability, and gauge their concerns and those of the owners of transported goods that they represent. According to Mohamed, the project's ultimate goal is to establish a fair transportation system. He also stressed that transport owners should make sure that their vehicles are in good condition and attain the standards of goods owners.

=== End of term ===
On 27 January 2015, Mohamed's term as Minister of Air and Land Transport of Somalia ended, following the appointment of a new Cabinet by Prime Minister Omar Abdirashid Ali Sharmarke. He was succeeded at the position by Ali Ahmed Jama Jangali.
