= Oltre Giuba =

1924–26 Italian colony in modern Somalia

Italian Trans-Juba Oltre Giuba Italiana (Italian)
- 1924–1926
- Flag
- Anthem: Marcia Reale
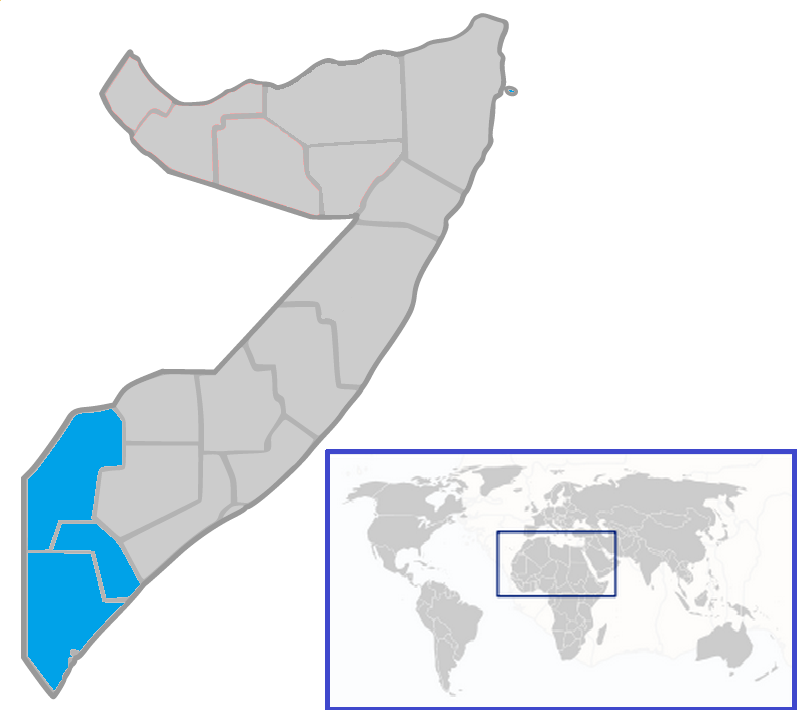
- Trans-Juba shown on a map of present-day Somalia
- Status: Italian colony
- Capital: Chisimaio
- Recognised national languages: Italian; Somali
- Religion: Islam
- King
  - 1924–1926: Victor Emmanuel III
- Historical era: Interwar period
  - Ceded to Italy: 15 July 1924
  - Territory organized: 10 July 1925
  - Part of Italian Somalia: 10 June 1926
- Currency: Italian lira
Preceded by	Succeeded by
Kenya Colony	Italian Somaliland

Oltre Giuba or Trans-Juba (Arabic: شرق جوبا الإيطالية) was an Italian colony in the territory of Jubaland in present-day southern Somalia. It lasted from 1924 until 1926, when it was absorbed into Italian Somaliland. Transjuba is the former name of Jubaland, a federal member state of Somalia.

== History ==
=== Jubaland ===
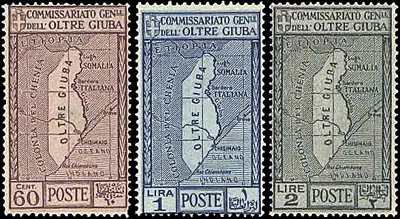
Trans-Juba ("Oltre Giuba") postage stamps of 1926

Italian Trans-Juba was established in 1924, after the United Kingdom ceded the northern portion of the Jubaland region to Italy as a reward for the Italians having joined the Allies in World War I. The territory thereafter had a brief existence as Trans-Juba (Oltre Giuba) under governor Corrado Zoli (16 July 1924–31 December 1926).

Italy issued its first postage stamps for the new colony on 29 July 1925, consisting of Italian stamps overprinted Oltre Giuba. Britain retained control of the southern half of the partitioned Jubaland territory, which was later called the Northern Frontier District.

In 1925, a year after its formation, Trans-Juba was integrated into Italian Somaliland.

The colony had a total area of 91,082 km² (33,000 sq mi), and in 1926, a population of 120,000 inhabitants. In the capital Kismayo (Chisimaio), there was a small group of Italian settlers, mostly merchants. During this period, the city was the third largest in Somalia and served as a port of call for small military ships.

=== Bajuni Islands ===
The Bajuni Islands ("Isole Giuba") were part of British East Africa until World War I. They were transferred to Italy in 1926.

== See also ==
- Postage stamps and postal history of Trans-Juba
- Italian Somaliland

== Bibliography ==
- Vittorio Bottego, Viaggi di scoperta nel cuore dell' Africa: il Giuba esplorato, sotta gli auspici della Società geografica italiana., E. Loescher & c.o, 1895
- Guida dell'Africa Orientale Italiana, Ed. Consociazione Turistica Italiana, Milano 1938, p. 585-596
- Tripodi, Paolo. The Colonial Legacy in Somalia. St. Martin's Press. New York, 1999.
