= Ministry of Communications and Technology (Somalia) =

Government ministry of Somalia

Ministry of Telecommunications
- Coat of arms of Somalia

Agency overview
- Formed: 2012
- Jurisdiction: Somalia
- Headquarters: Mogadishu
- Agency executive: Jama Hassan Khalif, Minister of Telecommunications
- Parent agency: Cabinet of Somalia

The Ministry of Communications and Technology is a ministry responsible for overseeing and managing telecommunications in Somalia. The current Minister of Telecommunications is Mohamed Adam Moalim.

== See also ==
- Agriculture in Somalia
