= Guled Hussein Kasim =

Somali politician

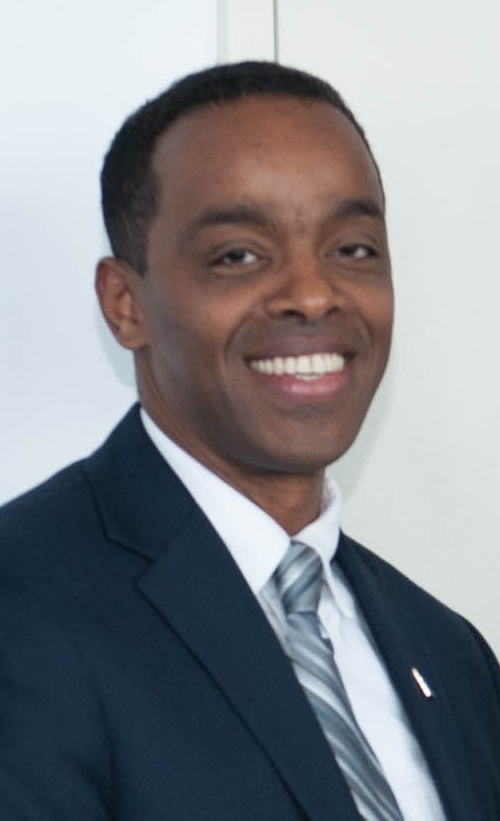
- Guled Hussein Kasim in 2018

Minister of Posts and Telecommunications
- In office 27 January 2015 – 29 March 2017
- President: Hassan Sheikh Mohamud
- Prime Minister: Omar Abdirashid Ali Sharmarke
- Succeeded by: Abdi Anshur Hassan

Personal details
- Born: Somalia
- Party: Independent

Guled Hussein Kassim is a Somali politician. He belongs to the Ogaden subclan of the Darod. He is the former Minister of Posts and Telecommunications of Somalia, having been appointed to the position on 27 January 2015 by the now former Prime Minister Omar Abdirashid Ali Sharmarke.

Kassim is a son of late Hussein Abdulkadir Kassim, an influential former minister in the Revolutionary Government of Somalia. He, a duo-citizen of both Somalia and United States, was educated in America.
