= Emirates Post =

- بريد الامارات

Agency overview
- Jurisdiction: United Arab Emirates
- Headquarters: Deira, Dubai
- Agency executives: Abdullah Al Ashram, GCEO; Peter Somers, CEO
- Parent agency: Emirates Post Group
- Website: emiratespost.ae

Emirates Post (Arabic: بريد الامارات) is the official postal operator for the United Arab Emirates. It is a subsidiary of Emirates Post Group.

== History ==
It was opened on August 19, 1909, being managed by the Indian Post Office Services until India’s independence in 1947. The postal services were finally established as the General Directorate of Postal Services under the Ministry of Communications in 1972, following the formation of the UAE.
