= Mohamud Hassan Suleiman =

Somali politician

Mohamud Hassan Suleiman محمود حسن سليمان
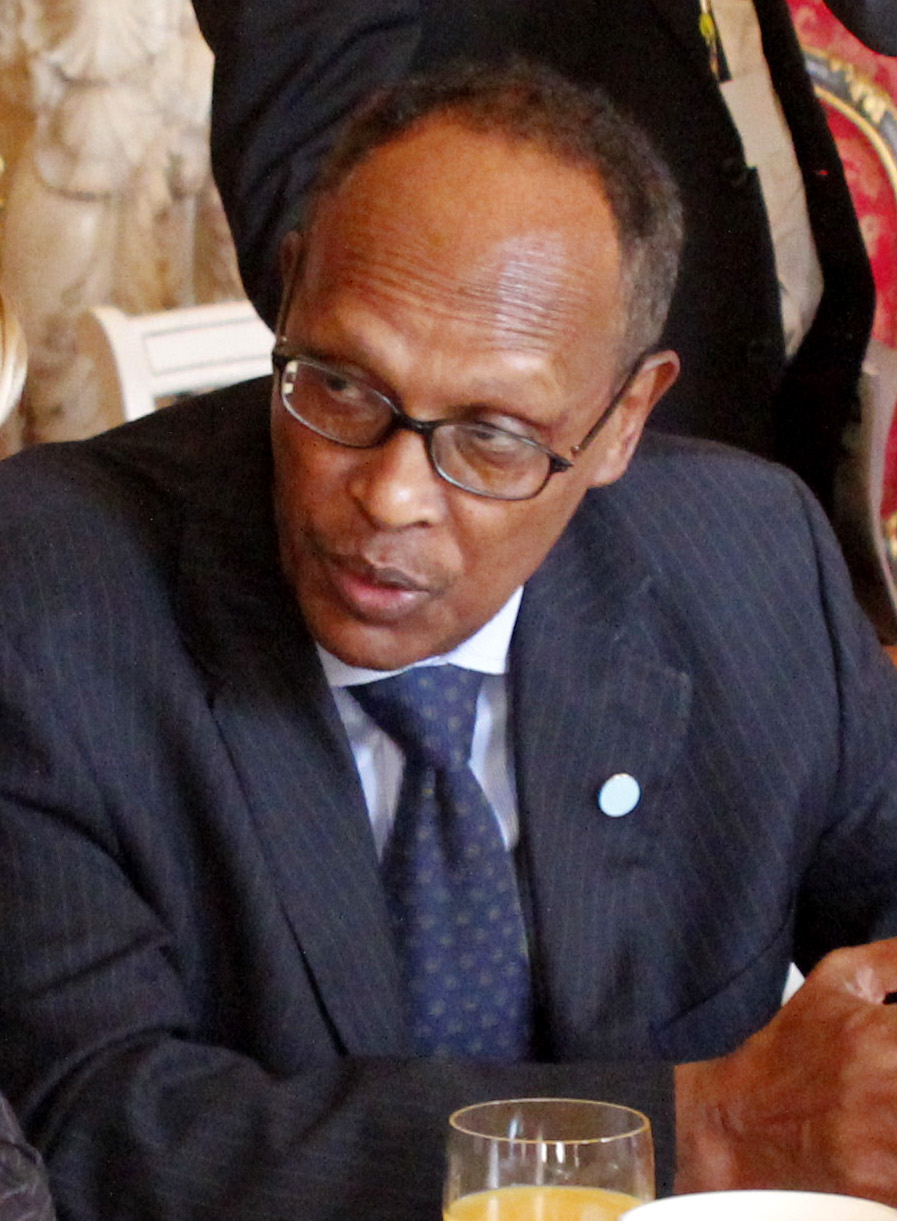

Minister of Finance and Planning of Somalia
- In office 4 November 2012 – 17 January 2014
- Prime Minister: Abdi Farah Shirdon
- Preceded by: Abdinasir Mohamed Abdulle
- Succeeded by: Hussein Abdi Halane

Mohamud Hassan Suleiman (Somali: Maxamuud Xasan Suleymaan, Arabic: محمود حسن سليمان) is a Somali politician. On 4 November 2012, he was appointed the Minister of Finance and Planning of Somalia by Prime Minister Abdi Farah Shirdon. On 17 January 2014, Suleiman was succeeded as Minister of Finance by Hussein Abdi Halane and as Minister of Planning by Said Abdullahi Mohamed.
