= Mohamed Sheikh Osman =

Somalian politician

== Overview ==
Mohamed Sheikh Osman (Somali: Maxamed Sheekh Cismaan) was a prominent Somali politician and Member of Parliament in the civilian government. He was initially a Colonel heading the CID division in 1960, he later held numerous ministerial positions in the non-civilian regime, including the position of Minister of Finance, which he held from 1984 to 1987, and from April 1989 to February 1990. He was also an active member of Siad Barre's military regime. He served as Chairman of the Military Safety Court. He later served as Somalia's Minister of Finance. He also general and one of the Supreme Revolutionary Council's twenty-five members

His son, Jibril Sheikh Osman, now holds political positions in the Somali government. One such position he has held is a Counselor for the Somali Ambassador for Ethiopia.

He died in December 2005.
