= Mohamud Ibrihim Adan =

Somali politician

Mohammed Adan Ibrahim محمد أدن إبراهيم

Minister of Finance
- In office 27 January 2015 – 29 March 2017
- President: Hassan Sheikh Mohamud
- Prime Minister: Omar Abdirashid Ali Sharmarke
- Preceded by: Hussein Abdi Halane
- Succeeded by: Abdirahman Duale Beyle

Personal details
- Born: Somalia
- Party: Independent

Mohamed Adan Ibrahim (Somali: Maxamed Aadan Ibrahim, Arabic: محمد أدن إبراهيم), also known as Mohamed Adan Ibrahim "Fargeti", is a Somali politician. Ibrahim served as the Minister of Finance as part of H.E. Omar Abdirashid Ali Sharmarke cabinet.

== Personal life ==
Adan was born in Baidoa, Somalia. He hails from Boqolhore, Disow, Godle subclan of the Rahaweyn.

== Career ==
H.E. Ibrahim received an MBA from the University of Science Malaysia in 1996 prior to that, he graduated from the National Institute of Statistics and Applied Economics in 1988.

In early 2000s Mr. Ibrahim moved to Sydney, Australia, where he managed large housing portfolio worth of $750m covering over 5000 residents. From 2004 to 2008 he was CEO of the Cumberland Housing Ltd managing similar housing developments. From 2009 to 2012, Mr. Ibrahim was the chairman of the Australian Somali Community Association (ASCA), shaping and leading the organization’s strategic direction, and coordinating with government and other key stakeholders for the development and delivery of programs. Mr. Ibrahim was an active and recognized leader in the Somali community, as well as a social advocate.

During the term of the former government, prior to the collapse, Mr. Ibrahim was overseeing the population census in Bay region and provided technical advice to various stakeholders. Mr. Ibrahim held multiple positions within the public sector, including Ministry of Jubba Valley and Somalia Libya Agricultural Development Co. Additionally, Mr. Ibrahim played an active role in 2003/2004 Eldoret Somali Reconciliation Conference where he was a leading delegate in the translation committee as well as the International Relations Committee. Mr. Ibrahim returned to Somalia to work with the Technical Selection Committee (TSC) as a vetting expert, where as part of the TSC, he successfully vetted both the 825 delegates that adopted the new Federal Constitution as well as members of Somali Federal Parliament.

=== Minister of Finance ===
On 27 January 2015, Adan was appointed Minister of Finance of Somalia by Prime Minister Omar Abdirashid Ali Sharmarke.

During his tenure as Minister of Finance, the payment systems were strengthened with the introduction of the Somali Financial Management Information Systems(SFMIS).

He also succeeded in ushering in the first IMF Article IV report on Somalia since 1989 and engaging in the IMF’s Staff Monitored Program, a first and significant step towards debt relief for Somalia.

The legislative framework has progressed with the passing of the Foreign Investment Law, Anti Money Laundering Act (AML/CFT), Audit bill and the Procurement bill. The Interim Procurement Board has been established to review large concession contracts. Mr Ibrahim has overseen the development and approval of a five year PFM Reform Action Plan and an Arrears Clearance Plan.

Mr Ibrahim established a Debt Management Unit (DMU)in the Ministry and as chair of the National Financial Integrity Committee, he oversaw the establishment of the Financial Reporting Centre (FRC).
