= Central Bank of Somalia =

State-owned bank in Somalia

Central Bank of Somalia Bankiga Dhexe ee Soomaaliya

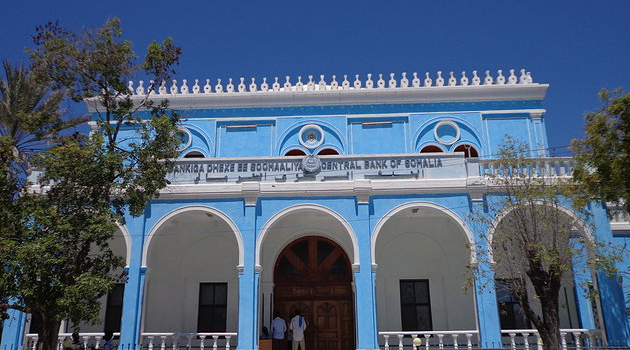
- Central Bank of Somalia, Mogadishu
- Central bank of: Somalia
- Headquarters: Mogadishu, Somalia
- Established: 30 June 1960; 66 years ago
- Ownership: 100% state ownership
- Governor: Abdirahman M. Abdullahi
- Currency: Somali shilling SOS (ISO 4217)
- Website: centralbank.gov.so

The Central Bank of Somalia (CBS; Somali: Bankiga Dhexe ee Soomaaliya; Arabic: البنك المركزي الصومالي) is the central bank and monetary authority of the Federal Republic of Somalia. It is headquartered in Mogadishu. Under its statutory mandate, the bank is responsible for price and financial stability, monetary and foreign-exchange policy, currency issuance, management of foreign reserves, supervision of financial institutions, and oversight of payment and settlement systems. It also acts as banker, adviser and fiscal agent to the Federal Government of Somalia and the Federal Member States, and publishes monetary, financial and economic statistics.

The institution was established as the Somali National Bank after independence in 1960 and was renamed the Central Bank of Somalia in 1975. Its operations were suspended after the collapse of the central government in 1991. Efforts to restore the institution began during the transitional-government period, and its statutory position was re-established by the Central Bank of Somalia Act 2012.

Since its re-establishment, the CBS has introduced regulatory, supervisory and payment-system reforms. These have included licensing frameworks for banks and non-bank financial institutions, interbank clearing and settlement infrastructure, bank-account and payment-code standards, and systems for instant payments. Reports by the International Monetary Fund (IMF), World Bank and African Development Bank have examined these reforms as part of Somalia’s wider programme of financial and public-sector reconstruction.

== History ==
=== Pre-independence monetary institutions ===
The institutional origins of central banking in Somalia date to the Italian Trusteeship Administration. In 1950, the Cassa per la Circolazione Monetaria della Somalia (CCMS) was created to issue and regulate currency in the Trust Territory of Somaliland. The CCMS introduced the somalo in the same year.

In the British Somaliland Protectorate, the Indian rupee remained in circulation until 1951, when it was replaced by the East African shilling. The CCMS moved its headquarters from Rome to Mogadishu in 1959.

=== Somali National Bank, 1960–1975 ===
The Somali National Bank was established in 1960, following the independence and union of the former British and Italian-administered territories. Its responsibilities included monetary stability, regulation of banking and credit, management of external reserves, and service as fiscal agent to the government.

Monetary unification followed independence. A presidential decree issued in 1961 provided for the replacement of the East African shilling in northern Somalia by the Somali shilling. The bank issued the first Somali-shilling banknotes in 1962, and the assets of the CCMS were transferred to it in 1963. The Somali Credit Bank was merged into the Somali National Bank in 1968. During this period, the institution carried out both central-banking and commercial-banking functions.

=== Central Bank of Somalia, 1975–1991 ===
In 1975, the Somali National Bank was renamed the Central Bank of Somalia. The change was associated with a move towards a more distinct central-banking mandate covering monetary policy, currency management and oversight of the financial sector.

During the 1980s, Somalia faced rising external debt, weak export performance and economic stagnation. The government entered structural-adjustment programmes with the IMF and World Bank. Armed conflict and the breakdown of state institutions intensified towards the end of the decade. The CBS suspended operations after the collapse of the central government in January 1991.

=== Institutional disruption and restoration ===
The absence of an operational central monetary authority after 1991 contributed to widespread use of foreign currency, irregular production of Somali-shilling banknotes and the growth of privately operated financial services, particularly money-transfer businesses.

Institutional restoration began during the transitional-government period. Mohamed Mohamud Ulusow served as governor from 2001 to 2005, followed by Bashir Isse Ali from 2005 to 2010 and Abdullahi Haji Jama from 2010 to 2013. The Central Bank of Somalia Act 2012 re-established the bank’s statutory role as the national monetary authority.

=== Reform since 2012 ===
Following Somalia’s transition from the Transitional Federal Government to the permanent Federal Government of Somalia in 2012, the Central Bank of Somalia gradually resumed its administrative, regulatory, and operational functions. Early reforms included restoration of international banking links, installation of a core banking system, development of fiscal-agent services, and the initial rebuilding of banking supervision. These measures provided the institutional basis for reforms undertaken from 2019 onwards.

=== Reforms since 2019 ===
Abdirahman Mohamed Abdullahi was appointed Governor of the Central Bank of Somalia in April 2019. During his tenure, the CBS implemented institutional and financial-sector reforms aimed at strengthening governance, regulatory and supervisory frameworks, and operational capacity. These reforms included the adoption of a function-based organisational structure in 2019, with clearly defined reporting lines, job descriptions, and performance objectives. The bank introduced merit-based recruitment, annual staff appraisals and training plans, while recruitment was moved towards competitive selection.

The CBS also expanded its role as fiscal agent to the federal government. Connections between the bank’s systems and the Somalia Financial Management Information System were established in 2019, allowing government revenues and payments to be processed electronically. Federal employees, security personnel and suppliers were subsequently paid directly into their accounts, while the Ministry of Finance gained direct access to government account balances at the CBS.

Financial-sector supervision was extended during the same period. Regulations governing mobile-money operators were issued in 2019, licensing began in 2020, and four operators had been licensed by 2023. The bank also continued the licensing and supervision of commercial banks and money-transfer businesses and introduced monthly reporting requirements for licensed mobile-money operators.

Development of the National Payment System began in 2019 with World Bank assistance. The system connected licensed commercial banks through clearing and settlement infrastructure managed by the CBS. Its implementation required a private fibre-optic network, disaster-recovery facilities and upgrades to commercial banks’ core systems. The platform entered operation in 2021, and the national quick-response standard, SOMQR, was introduced in 2023.

Internal operations and financial controls were also revised. The bank automated accounting and operational processes, developed internal policies and procedures, expanded its research and statistical functions, and began publishing quarterly economic reports. The report linked stronger internal controls to repeated clean external-audit opinions.

The report also identified unfinished reforms. These included widening the regulatory perimeter, strengthening the bank’s operational and financial independence, completing amendments to financial-sector legislation, and establishing a sustainable funding model. It noted that the CBS remained dependent on commissions from federal-government revenue and required adequate capitalisation to support a more independent revenue base.

== Mandate and governance ==
The primary statutory objective of the CBS is to achieve and maintain domestic price stability. Its other functions include supporting financial-system stability; formulating and implementing monetary and foreign-exchange policy; issuing and managing currency; managing foreign reserves; licensing and supervising financial institutions; overseeing payment and settlement systems; serving as banker and fiscal agent to government; and publishing financial and economic statistics.

The bank is governed by a board of directors and headed by a governor. Its internal arrangements include committees responsible for decision-making, risk management, audit and other control functions. IMF programme reviews have reported the continued implementation of safeguards recommendations and changes to governance and decision-making procedures.

== Legal status and accountability ==
The Central Bank of Somalia Act 2012 establishes the CBS as an autonomous legal entity. The Act provides for legal personality, a head office and branches, authorised capital, exemption from taxation, and powers to issue regulations. It also sets out the bank’s relationship with Parliament, the government and other public entities.

The Act requires the bank to publish annual reports, financial statements, monetary-policy statements and other reports. It generally prohibits lending to government and public entities, while permitting temporary direct advances subject to statutory conditions. The bank also serves as fiscal agent, banker and foreign-exchange dealer for the government.

== Board and executive management ==
The Act assigns the general management of the bank to a board of directors and provides for a governor and deputy governor. It addresses the composition and appointment of the board, eligibility and disqualification, meetings, remuneration, confidentiality, and the powers of the board. The governor and deputy governor are appointed under the statutory procedure set out in the Act.

The bank’s published organisational structure groups its work under currency and banking operations; monetary, financial and regulatory policy; financial, administrative and support services; the Office of the Governor; and internal audit. The CBS website also publishes separate pages for the board of directors and senior management.

== Proposed 2026 amendments ==
In 2026, the Federal Government of Somalia introduced a bill to amend the Central Bank of Somalia Act 2012. The proposed amendments address the CBS’s legal framework, governance, monetary policy powers, and preparations for the reintroduction of the Somali shilling. The House of the People completed its consideration of the bill and transmitted it to the Upper House in October 2026. The amendments remain subject to approval by the Upper House and presidential assent before entering into force.

== Currency and monetary policy ==
The Somali shilling is the national currency. The disruption of public institutions after 1991 limited the central bank’s ability to conduct conventional monetary policy or control currency issuance. Foreign currencies, particularly the United States dollar, became widely used in domestic transactions.

The CBS strategy for 2025–2029 identifies the establishment of a viable national currency and the development of monetary and foreign-exchange policy instruments as institutional priorities. The strategy also links currency reform to financial stability, payment infrastructure and the bank’s operational capacity.

== Monetary-policy instruments and banking operations ==
The 2012 Act authorises the CBS to impose reserve requirements, conduct open-market operations, lend to banks and act as lender of last resort. It also permits dealings in gold and foreign exchange and the management of external reserve assets.

In practice, extensive use of the United States dollar and the limited circulation of a centrally issued national currency constrain the use of conventional monetary-policy instruments. IMF assessments have therefore treated currency reform, reserve management, liquidity arrangements and the development of financial markets as part of the longer-term reconstruction of the monetary framework.

== Currency issuance and cash operations ==
The Central Bank of Somalia Act gives the CBS authority over the issue, legal-tender status and withdrawal of Somali notes and coins. It also provides for the exchange of mutilated currency. The bank’s statutory functions include currency management and the maintenance of banking operations needed to support issuance and circulation.

Currency operations remain shaped by the institutional disruption that followed 1991, when irregularly produced Somali-shilling notes entered circulation and foreign currency became widely used. The bank’s 2025–2029 strategy identifies the establishment of a viable national currency as a priority, but the article does not treat the strategy as evidence that a replacement currency has already been issued.

== Financial regulation and supervision ==
The CBS is the principal regulator and supervisor of Somalia’s financial sector. Its supervisory remit covers commercial banks, money-transfer businesses, mobile-money service providers, microfinance institutions, payment-system operators, payment-service providers, development-finance businesses, savings and credit cooperative societies, and takaful operators.

The Financial Institutions Law No. 38 of 11 May 2025 replaced the Financial Institutions Law No. 130 of 22 April 2012. The 2025 law revised the legal framework for financial institutions and expanded provisions concerning non-bank financial institutions.

IMF reviews have reported progress in risk-based supervision, regulatory data collection and supervisory technology. They have also identified consolidated supervision, Sharia compliance and anti-money-laundering and counter-terrorist-financing supervision as areas requiring further development.

== Financial stability ==
As the formal financial sector expanded, financial stability became a more distinct part of the bank’s work. The CBS established mechanisms for monitoring systemic risks and assessing financial-sector vulnerabilities. A Financial Stability Committee was inaugurated in November 2025.

In its 2026 Article IV mission statement, IMF staff reported continued work by the CBS on financial supervision and inclusion. The statement also identified financial stability, payment-system oversight, financial infrastructure and anti-money-laundering and counter-terrorist-financing controls as continuing policy areas.

== Market conduct and bank resolution ==
The financial-sector framework gives the CBS powers to license, supervise and, where statutory conditions are met, revoke the licences of regulated institutions. Prudential rules published by the bank cover capital adequacy, liquidity, governance, internal audit, related-party transactions, asset classification, operational risk, customer registration and mobile-money services.

The Financial Institutions Law 2012 required the Central Bank of Somalia, in consultation with the Minister of Finance, to establish a Deposit Protection Fund. Section 100 defined its purposes as protecting bank depositors and contributing to the stability of Somalia's financial system. It also required the CBS to issue regulations consistent with the core principles for effective deposit-insurance systems.

The Financial Institutions Law 2025 subsequently expanded the framework for prudential supervision, regulatory intervention, recovery planning, and the resolution or liquidation of distressed financial institutions.

The CBS’s published regulatory register does not identify implementing regulations, coverage limits or payout arrangements for the Deposit Protection Fund.

== Payment systems ==
The National Payment System was launched in 2021. It connected licensed commercial banks through common clearing and settlement arrangements, including real-time gross settlement, an automated clearing house and funds-transfer services. The infrastructure uses the ISO 20022 financial-messaging standard. The IMF described the launch as a milestone in the development of bank interoperability in Somalia.

The CBS introduced the International Bank Account Number standard in March 2023 and the Somalia Quick Response Code standard, known as SOMQR, in June 2023. It later launched the Somalia Instant Payment System, which supports real-time payments among participating banks, mobile-money providers and payment-service providers.

Somalia became a member of the African Export-Import Bank in March 2025. In March 2026, the CBS signed an agreement concerning participation in the Pan-African Payment and Settlement System, a regional platform for cross-border payments and settlement.[14]

In 2023, the publication Central Banking gave the CBS its Payments and Market Infrastructure Development Award. The award citation referred to the National Payment System, payment-switch infrastructure, anti-money-laundering controls, and the adoption of SWIFT and IBAN standards.

== Financial inclusion and digital finance ==
Mobile money and other digital financial services account for a large share of financial activity in Somalia. According to the CBS Somalia Financial Access Survey 2026, 90 per cent of adults met the survey’s definition of financial inclusion, 87 per cent used mobile-money services and 19 per cent had bank accounts.

The bank’s framework for mobile-money and other digital-finance activities includes licensing, payment-system and financial-integrity requirements. Interoperability measures are intended to connect banks, mobile-money providers and other payment services. IMF and African Development Bank programmes have supported work on financial inclusion, supervisory capacity and access to finance.

== Role in economic and financial reconstruction ==
The restoration of the CBS formed part of wider efforts to rebuild Somalia’s public financial institutions. World Bank reports have described the development of banking supervision, financial-sector legislation, interbank connectivity and payment infrastructure during this period.

The bank also participated in reforms linked to Somalia’s re-engagement with international financial institutions and the country’s progress under the Heavily Indebted Poor Countries Initiative. Somalia reached the initiative’s completion point in 2023. Its external debt fell from about US$5.2 billion in 2018, equivalent to approximately 64 per cent of gross domestic product, to about US$638 million, or 5.5 per cent of gross domestic product, by the end of 2023.

== Regional and international cooperation ==
The CBS works with international financial institutions and regional central-bank bodies. Its official website lists links to the Association of African Central Banks, the Alliance for Financial Inclusion, the International Monetary Fund, the World Bank, the African Development Bank, the African Export-Import Bank, the Islamic Financial Services Board and the Accounting and Auditing Organization for Islamic Financial Institutions.

Following Somalia’s accession to the East African Community, the CBS joined the EAC Monetary Affairs Committee in 2024. The committee coordinates work on monetary-policy frameworks, financial regulation, statistics, crisis management and cross-border payment systems as part of preparations for the proposed East African Monetary Union.

The East African Monetary Union Protocol envisages progressive convergence towards a common currency, including harmonisation of monetary and fiscal policies, payment and settlement systems, financial reporting and statistical standards, and the eventual establishment of an East African central bank. Somalia continues to use the Somali shilling; EAC membership does not itself amount to adoption of a regional currency.

== Institutional development ==
Subsequent institutional-development measures included further changes to risk management, audit and operational controls. The bank reported unqualified external-audit opinions for the six financial years from 2020 to 2025. Deloitte & Touche LLP audited the financial statements, which were prepared under International Financial Reporting Standards.

In 2026, the bank obtained ISO/IEC 27001:2022 certification for its information-security management system.

The 2025–2029 Strategic Plan sets out four priorities: development of a viable national currency and monetary and foreign-exchange policy; stability, effectiveness and inclusion in the financial system; payment and financial-market infrastructure; and governance, institutional resilience and operational effectiveness. In 2026, the African Development Bank began supporting preparation of a five-year Financial Sector Development Roadmap aligned with the strategy.

== Operational presence ==
The bank’s head office is in Mogadishu. Official Central Bank of Somalia procurement documents identify regional branches in Baidoa, Dhusamareb and Jowhar. The Central Bank of Somalia Act 2012 authorises the bank to establish branches and appoint agents.

== Institutional constraints ==
External assessments have continued to identify constraints on the bank’s operations. These include high dollarisation, limited monetary-policy transmission, gaps in consolidated and risk-based supervision, and the need to strengthen reserves and crisis-management arrangements.

== Research and publications ==
The bank publishes annual reports, audited financial statements, quarterly economic reports, statistical bulletins, financial-access surveys, policy briefs and research on monetary, financial and macroeconomic subjects.

== Governors ==
The following individuals have served as heads of the Central Bank of Somalia and its predecessor, the Somali National Bank. Terms are shown by year.

- Dr. Abdi Adan Mohamed, 1960–1964
- Sh. Abdi Haji Abikar, 1964–1968
- Dr. Abdullahi Ahmed Addow, 1968–1970
- Abdirahman Nur Hirsi, 1970–1974
- Omar Ahmed Omar, 1974–1978
- Mahmoud Jama Ahmed, 1978–1984
- Omar Ahmed Omar, 1984–1987
- Mahmoud Mohamed Nur, 1987–1989
- Omar Ahmed Omar, 1989–1990
- Ali Abdi Amalow, 1990–1991
- Vacant, 1991 - 2001
- Mohamed Mohamud Ulusow, 2001–2005
- Bashir Isse Ali, 2005–2010
- Abdullahi Haji Jama, 2010–2013
- Dr. Abdusalam Omar Hadliye, 2013
- Ms. Yussur A. F. Abrar, 2013
- Bashir Isse Ali, 2013–2019
- Abdirahman Mohamed Abdullahi, 2019–present
