= List of mobile network operators in the Middle East and Africa =

This is a list of mobile network operators of the Middle East and Africa

== Algeria ==
In Q2 of 2025, the penetration rate was estimated at 115.77% over a population estimate of 47.40 million.

The telecom regulator in Algeria is Autorité de Régulation de la Poste et des Communications Electroniques (ARPCE).

Rank	Operator	Technology	Subscribers (in millions)	Ownership
1	Mobilis	GSM-900/1800 MHz (GPRS, EDGE); 2100 MHz UMTS, HSPA, HSPA+ 1800 MHz LTE	23.3 (Q2 2025)	Algérie Télécom
2	Djezzy	GSM-900/1800 MHz (GPRS, EDGE); 2100 MHz UMTS, HSPA, HSPA+ 1800 MHz LTE	17.4 (Q2 2025)	State-owned
3	Ooredoo (formerly Nedjma)	GSM-900/1800 MHz (GPRS, EDGE); 2100 MHz UMTS, HSPA, HSPA+ 1800 MHz LTE	14.2 (Q2 2025)	Ooredoo (74.4%)

== Angola ==
In September 2010 the penetration rate was estimated at 63.7% over a population estimate of 13.3 million.

The telecom regulator in Angola is Instituto Angolano das Comunicações (INACOM).

Rank	Operator	Technology	Subscribers (in millions)	Ownership
1	Unitel	GSM-900/1800 (GPRS, EDGE); 900/2100 MHz UMTS, HSDPA; 800/1800 MHz LTE	10.5 (November 2024)	Sonangol (50%) Government of Angola (50%)
2	Movicel	GSM (GPRS, EDGE); 900 MHz UMTS, HSDPA; 1800 MHz LTE	9.5 (September 2024)	Government (Angola Telecom) (18%), Correios Telegrafos de Angola (2%), Porturil (40%), Modus Comicare (19%), Ipang (10%), Lambda (6%)
3	Africell		5 (September 2024)	Africell Group

== Bahrain ==
At the end of 2011 the penetration rate was estimated at 133% over a population estimate of 1.27 million.

The telecom regulator in Bahrain is Telecommunications Regulatory Authority of Bahrain (TRA).

Rank	Operator	Technology	Subscribers (in millions)	Ownership
1	Batelco	GSM-900 (GPRS, EDGE); 2100 MHz UMTS, DC-HSPA+ 1800 MHz LTE	3.9 (Dec 2022)	Bahrain Telecommunications Company
2	Zain (formerly MTC-Vodafone)	GSM-900/1800 (GPRS, EDGE); 2100 MHz UMTS, HSDPA; 1800 MHz LTE; WiMAX	0.787 (Sep 2014)	Zain Group (56.25%)
3	stc	GSM-900/1800 (GPRS, EDGE); 2100 MHz UMTS, DC-HSPA+ 1800 MHz LTE	Not Yet Available	STC

== Benin ==
In December 2015, the penetration rate was estimated at 90.33% (in 2014, the population was estimated as 10.33 millions).

The telecom regulator in Benin is Autorité de régulation des communications électroniques et de la poste (ARCEP Benin).

Rank	Operator	Technology	Subscribers (in millions)	Ownership
1	MTN	GSM-900/1800 MHz UMTS, DC-HSPA+ LTE	7 (Dec 2022)	MTN (75%)
2	Moov	GSM-900 MHz; UMTS, DC-HSPA+ LTE	3.3 (Dec 2015)	Etisalat
3	Glo	GSM-900/1800 MHz	1.7 (Dec 2015)	Globacom
4	Libercom	GSM-900 MHz	0.056 (Dec 2015)	Benin Telecom
-	BBcom	GSM-900/1800 MHz	ND (Dec 2015)	Bell Benin Communications

== Botswana ==
In March 2015 the penetration rate was 167% over a population estimate of 2.05 millions.

The telecom regulator in Botswana is Botswana Communications Regulatory Authority (BOCRA).

Rank	Operator	Technology	Subscribers (in millions)	Ownership
1	Mascom	GSM-900; 2100 MHz UMTS, HSPA+ LTE	1.7 (March 2015)	Mascom, MTN (53%)
2	Orange	GSM-900; 2100 MHz UMTS, HSDPA LTE	1.1 (March 2015)	Orange S.A. (69%), Mosokelatsebeng Cellular (local investors, 26%), local individuals (5%)
3	btc	GSM-900/1800; UMTS	0.52 (March 2015)	BTC Botswana Telecommunications Corporation

== Burkina Faso ==
In December 2011 the penetration rate was estimated at 36% over a population estimate of 16.7 million.

The telecom regulator in Burkina Faso is Autorité de régulation des communications électroniques et des postes (ARCEP), the current name of the former Autorité de régulation des communications électroniques (ARCE) and of the previous Autorité de régulation des télécommunications (ARTEL).

Rank	Operator	Technology	Subscribers (in millions)	Ownership
1	Orange	GSM 900 MHz (GPRS, EDGE); 2100 MHz UMTS, HSPA+	4.1 (2012)	Orange
2	Telmob (Onatel)	CDMA2000, EVDO; GSM 900 MHz (GPRS, EDGE); 2100 MHz UMTS, DC-HSPA+	3.9 (2012)	Maroc Telecom (51%)
3	Telecel Faso	GSM-900 MHz (GPRS, EDGE)	2 (2012)	Planor Afrique

== Burundi ==
In 2011 the penetration rate was estimated at 20% over a population estimate of 8 million.

The telecom regulator in Burundi is Agence de Régulation et de Contrôle des Télécommunications (ARCT).

Rank	Operator	Technology	Subscribers (in millions)	Ownership
1	Lumitel (Viettel Burundi S.A.)	GSM; UMTS; 4G LTE	3 (December 2020)	Viettel Group (Vietnam)
2	Econet Leo	CDMA; GSM-900/1800 MHz; 2100 MHz UMTS LTE	2.6 (July 2015)	Econet Wireless (purchased Leo from Vimpelcom)
3	ONAMOB	GSM-900 MHz	0.140 (November 2008)	Onatel Burundi (state owned)
4	Smart Mobile (formerly Lacell)	GSM-1800 MHz; UMTS	Not Yet Available	Smart Telecom

== Cameroon ==
In July 2011 the penetration rate was estimated at 43% over a population estimate of 19.7 million.

The telecom regulator in Cameroon is Agence de Régulation des Télécommunications (ART).

Rank	Operator	Technology	Subscribers (in millions)	Ownership
1	MTN	GSM-MHz 900 LTE	10.1 (dec 2014)	MTN Group (70%)
2	Orange	GSM-900 MHz LTE	6.2 (dec 2014)	Orange S.A.
3	Nexttel	GSM-900/1800 MHz; UMTS	2.0 (May 2015)	Viettel Global, Bestinver Cameroon S.A.R.L
4	Camtel	GSM	new licence in September 2014	Camtel (government)
5	YooMee	WiMAX	Not yet available	YooMee

== Cape Verde ==
In September 2010 the penetration rate was estimated at 87.5% over a population estimate of 0.5 million.

The telecom regulator in Cape Verde is Agência Nacional de Comunicações (ANAC).

Rank	Operator	Technology	Subscribers (in millions)	Ownership
1	CV Móvel	GSM-900/1800 MHz UMTS	0.355 (September 2009)	Portugal Telecom (40%)
2	T-MAIS	GSM-900/1800 MHz	0.047 (Q1 2010)	T-Mais

== Central African Republic ==
In September 2010 the penetration rate was estimated at 17.2% over a population estimate of 4.9 million.

The telecom regulator in Central African Republic is Agence de régulation des télécommunications (ART).

Rank	Operator	Technology	Subscribers (in millions)	Ownership
1	telecel	GSM-900; 2100 MHz UMTS	0.143 (December 2008)	Orascom Telecom
2	Orange	GSM-1800 (GPRS); 2100 MHz UMTS, HSPA+ 900 MHz, 1800 MHz LTE	0.189 (December 2009)	Orange S.A.
3	azur	GSM-900; 2100 MHz UMTS	0.158 (December 2008)	Bintel
4	Moov Africa	GSM-900; 2100 MHz UMTS; 1800 MHz LTE	Not Yet Available	Maroc Telecom

== Chad ==
In September 2010 the penetration rate was estimated at 24.3% over a population estimate of 10.7 million.

The telecom regulator in Chad is Office Tchadien de Régulation des Télécommunications (OTRT).

Rank	Operator	Technology	Subscribers (in millions)	Ownership
1	Moov	GSM-900/1800 MHz (GPRS, EDGE) 2100 MHz UMTS, HSPA LTE	1.257 (October 2010)	Maroc Telecom
2	Airtel	GSM-900 MHz (GPRS, EDGE); 2100 MHz UMTS, HSDPA LTE	1.199 (June 2009)	Bharti Airtel

== Comoros ==
In September 2010 the penetration rate was estimated at 20.8% over a population estimate of 0.8 million.

The telecom regulator in Comoros is Autorité Nationale de Régulation des TIC (ANRTIC).

Rank	Operator	Technology	Subscribers (in millions)	Ownership
1	HURI	GSM-900 UMTS, HSPA, HSPA+ LTE	0.056 (2007)	government (Societe Nationale des Telecommunications)
2	Telma	GSM-900/1800 MHz (GPRS, EDGE. 3G HSPA Plus + 2100 MHz,4G LTE 10 MHz)	-	Telecom Madagascar

== Congo ==
In Q4 2015 the penetration rate was estimated at 95.7% over a population estimate of 4.6 million.

The telecom regulator in Congo is Agence de Régulation des postes et des Communications Electroniques (ARPCE).

Rank	Operator	Technology	Subscribers (in millions)	Ownership
1	MTN	GSM-900 MHz; UMTS, HSPA, HSPA+ LTE	2.250 (Q4 2015)	MTN
2	Airtel	GSM-900 MHz; 2100 MHz UMTS, HSPA+ LTE	1.851 (Q4 2015)	Bharti Airtel (90%)
3	Azur	GSM-900/1800 MHz	0.313 (Q4 2015)	Bintel

== Democratic Republic of the Congo ==
In 2016 the penetration rate was estimated at 50% over a population estimate of 80 million.

The telecom regulator in Democratic Republic of the Congo is Agence de Régulation de la Poste et des Télécommunications du Congo (ARPTC).

Rank	Operator	Technology	Subscribers (in millions)	Ownership
1	Vodacom	GSM-900/1800 (GPRS, EDGE); 2100 MHz UMTS, HSPA+ WiMAX	26.435 (July 2026)	Vodacom (51%), Congolese Wireless Network (49%)
2	Orange	GSM-900 (GPRS, EDGE); 2100 MHz UMTS, HSPA+	10.674 (Q3 2015)	Orange S.A.
3	Africell	GSM; UMTS	5.5 (Dec 2014)	Africell Holding
4	Airtel	GSM-900 (GPRS, EDGE); 2100 MHz UMTS, HSPA+	5.0 (Aug 2012)	Bharti Airtel (98.5%)
5	Supercell	GSM-900	0.028 (covers Kivu only)	
6	SemaTel	GSM	not started	Hits Telecom (60%)
7	U-Com	CDMA	not started	Global Vision Telecom (Telecel International)
-	Smile	LTE	launch expected in 2016	Smile Communications (Al-Nahla Technology, Atheeb Trading Company, Capitalworks, Verene)

== Djibouti ==
In September 2010 the penetration rate was estimated at 14.88% over a population estimate of 0.75 million.

The telecom regulator in Djibouti is Ministère de la Communication chargé des Postes et des Télécommunications (MCPT).

Rank	Operator	Technology	Subscribers (in millions)	Ownership
1	Evatis	GSM-900 MHz; UMTS, HSPA	0.106 (Q1 2010)	Djibouti Telecom (government)

== Egypt ==
Egypt has 122.97 million mobile users as of December 2025, government figures showed.

The telecom regulator in Egypt is National Telecom Regulatory Authority (NTRA).

Rank	Operator	Technology	Subscribers (in millions)	Ownership
1	Vodafone Egypt	GSM-900 MHz (GPRS, EDGE); 900/2100 MHz UMTS, HSDPA, HSUPA, HSPA+ LTE, 5G NR	56.471 (July 2026)	Vodacom Group (55%), Telecom Egypt (45%)
2	Orange (formerly Mobinil)	GSM-900 MHz (GPRS, EDGE); 900/2100 MHz UMTS, HSDPA, HSUPA, HSPA+ LTE, 5G NR	27.601 (July 2020)	Orange S.A. (99.39%), free float (0.61%)
3	Etisalat	GSM-900/1800 MHz (GPRS, EDGE); 900/2100 MHz UMTS, HSDPA, HSUPA, HSPA+ LTE, 5G NR	26.0 (July 2020)	Etisalat (76%), Egypt Post (20%), Other Investors (4%)
4	We (by Telecom Egypt)	GSM-900 MHz (GPRS, EDGE); 900/2100 MHz UMTS, HSDPA, HSUPA, HSPA+ LTE, 5G NR	14.3 (March 2025)	Egyptian government (80%), free float (20%)

== Equatorial Guinea ==
In September 2010 the penetration rate was estimated at 74% over a population estimate of 0.6 million.

The telecom regulator in Equatorial Guinea is Órgano Regulador de las Telecomunicaciones Telecommunications Regulatory Agency (ORTEL).

Rank	Operator	Technology	Subscribers (in millions)	Ownership
1	Orange	GSM-900 MHz	0.333 (Dec 2009)	Orange S.A. (40%), Equatorial Guinea state (60%)
2	Muni	GSM-900/1800 MHz UMTS	0.150 (September 2013)	Green-com S.A. (Hits Africa)
3	Gecomsa		not yet available (created in 2012)	Equatorial Guinea state (51%), China state (49%)

== Eritrea ==
Data from GSMA Intelligence shows that there were 1.58 million cellular mobile connections in Eritrea at the start of 2024. GSMA Intelligence's numbers indicate that mobile connections in Eritrea were equivalent to 41.9 percent of the total population in January 2024. The number of mobile connections in Eritrea increased by 122 thousand (+8.3 percent) between the start of 2023 and the start of 2024.

In September 2010 the penetration rate was estimated at 3.4% over a population estimate of 5.9 million.

The telecom regulator in Eritrea is Eritrean Communications Regulatory Authority (ECRA).

Rank	Operator	Technology	Subscribers (in millions)	Ownership
1	Eritel	GSM-900 MHz (GPRS)	1.58	Eritrea Telecommunications Services Corporation

== Eswatini ==
In September 2010 the penetration rate was estimated at 49.55% over a population estimate of 1.37 million.

The telecom regulator in Eswatini is Eswatini Communications Commission (ESCCom).

Rank	Operator	Technology	Subscribers (in millions)	Ownership
1	MTN	GSM-900 MHz (GPRS, EDGE); 2100 MHz UMTS, HSDPA LTE	0.928 (Sep 2014)	MTN Group (30%)
2	Eswatini Mobile	LTE	Not yet available	

== Ethiopia ==
Data from GSMA Intelligence shows that there were 77.39 million cellular mobile connections in Ethiopia at the start of 2024. GSMA Intelligence's numbers indicate that mobile connections in Ethiopia were equivalent to 60.4 percent of the total population in January 2024. The number of mobile connections in Ethiopia increased by 8.2 million (+11.9 percent) between the start of 2023 and the start of 2024.

In September 2010 the penetration rate was estimated at 4.6% over a population estimate of 90.8 million.

The telecom regulator in Ethiopia is Ministry of Communication and Information Technology (MCIT).

Rank	Operator	Technology	Subscribers (in millions)	Ownership
1	Ethiotelecom	GSM 900 MHz (GPRS, EDGE); 2100 MHz UMTS, HSDPA, HSUPA, HSPA, HSPA+ LTE	78.3	Ethiopian Telecommunications Corporation
2	Safaricom Telecommunications Ethiopia	2G, 3G, 4G	9	Safaricom (55.7%)|Sumitomo Corporation (27.20%)|British International Investment (10.9%)|Vodacom (6.20%)

== Gabon ==
In June 2018 the penetration rate was estimated to at almost 157%.

The telecom regulator in Gabon is Autorité de Régulation des communications Electroniques et des Postes (ARCEP) ARCEP.

Rank	Operator	Technology	Subscribers (in millions)	Ownership
1	Airtel (formerly Celtel, Zain)	GSM-900 MHz (GPRS, EDGE); 2100 MHz UMTS, HSPA+ LTE	1.181 (June 2018)	Bharti Airtel (90%)
2	Moov Africa Gabon Telecom	GSM-900 MHz	1.648 (June 2018)	Maroc Telecom (51%), Gabonese government (49%)

== Gambia ==
In 2010 the penetration rate was estimated at 85.53% over a population estimate of 1.77 million.

The telecom regulator in Gambia is Public Utilities Regulatory Authority (PURA).

Rank	Operator	Technology	Subscribers (in millions)	Ownership
1	Africell	GSM-900/1800 (GPRS, EDGE); 2100 MHz UMTS, HSDPA LTE	1.30 (Jan 2015)	Africell Gambia LTD
2	Comium	GSM-900/1800 (GPRS)	0.25 (2012)	Comium Group
3	Gamcel	GSM-900	0.24 (2012)	Gambia Telecommunications Cellular Company Ltd
4	Qcell	GSM-900 (GPRS, EDGE); 2100 MHz UMTS, HSDPA	0.115 (2012)	Qcell

== Ghana ==
In June 2025 the penetration rate was estimated at 122.92% over a population estimate of 35.0 million.

The telecom regulator in Ghana is National Communications Authority (NCA).

Rank	Operator	Technology	Subscribers (in millions)	Ownership
1	MTN	GSM-900/1800 (GPRS, EDGE); 900/2100 MHz UMTS, HSDPA LTE	30.26 (Q2 2025)	MTN (97.7%)
2	Telecel Ghana	GSM-900 (GPRS, EDGE); 2100 MHz UMTS, HSDPA LTE	7.63 (Q2 2025)	Telecel Group (70%) Government of Ghana (30%)
3	AT Ghana		3.19 (Q2 2025)	Government of Ghana

== Guinea ==
In Q4 2015, the penetration rate was estimated at 99.1% over a population estimate of 10.8 million.

The telecom regulator in Guinea is Autorité de Régulation des Postes et Télécommunications (ARPT).

Rank	Operator	Technology	Subscribers (in millions)	Ownership
1	Orange	GSM-900/1800 MHz	5.24 (Q4 2015)	Orange S.A. (52.2%)
2	MTN (formerly Areeba)	GSM-900/1800 MHz (GPRS); 2100 MHz UMTS, HSPA+ WiMAX	3.21 (Q4 2015)	MTN (75%)
3	Cellcom Guinée	GSM-900/1800 MHz; 2100 MHz UMTS	2.14 (Q4 2015)	Cellcom Telecommunications Ltd
4	Intercel	GSM-900 MHz	0.11 (Q4 2015)	Telecel Guinee SARL
5	Sotelgui	GSM-900 MHz	0.16	Telekom Malaysia, government

== Guinea-Bissau ==
In March 2015 the penetration rate was estimated at 67.0% over a population estimate of 1.75 million.

The telecom regulator in Guinea-Bissau is Autoridade Reguladora Nacional das Tecnologias de Informação e Comunicação da Guiné Bissau (ARN).

Rank	Operator	Technology	Subscribers (in millions)	Ownership
1	MTN	GSM-900/1800 UMTS LTE	0.575 (Sep 2014)	MTN Group
2	Orange	GSM-900/1800 LTE	0.477 (Dec 2013)	Orange S.A. (52.2%)
3	Guinetel	GSM-900	not available	Guinea Telecom

== Iran ==
In December 2020 the penetration rate was estimated at 151.91% over a population estimate of 80 million.

The telecom regulator in Iran is Communications Regulatory Authority of Iran سازمان تنظيم مقررات و ارتباطات رادیویی (CRA).

Rank	Operator	Technology	Subscribers (in millions)	Ownership
1	Hamrahe Aval	GSM 900/1800 MHz (GPRS, EDGE); 2100/900 MHz (HSPA, DC-HSPA+); 1800/2600/2100/900/2300 MHz (LTE, LTE-A), (VoLTE, VoWiFi)	68 (Q4 2020)	Telecommunication Company of Iran
2	Irancell	GSM 900/1800 MHz (GPRS, EDGE); 2100/900 MHz (HSPA, DC-HSPA+); 1800/2600/2100/900/2300 MHz (LTE, LTE-A), (VoLTE)	55 (Q4 2020)	Iran Electronic Development Company (51%); MTN Group (49%)
3	RighTel	2100/900 MHz (HSPA, DC-HSPA+); 1800 MHz (LTE)	2.5 (Q1 2018)	Social Security Investment Company

== Iraq ==
In September 2010 the penetration rate was estimated at 74.2% over a population estimate of 30.4 million.

The telecom regulator in Iraq is Communications and Media Commission هيئة الإعلام والإتصالات (CMC).

Rank	Operator	Technology	Subscribers (in millions)	Ownership
1	Zain	GSM-900 MHz (GPRS, EDGE, 3G) LTE	14.9 (July 2020)	Zain Group (71.67%)
2	Asia Cell	GSM-900 MHz (GPRS, EDGE)	13.3 (Q2 2020)	Ooredoo (30%)
3	Korek	GSM-900 MHz (GPRS, HSPA)	Not Yet Available	Korek Telecom Ltd.
4	Omnnea	CDMA	Not Yet Available	Omnnea
5	Itisaluna	CDMA 2000 1x & EVDO-450,800,1900 MHz	Not Yet Available	Itisaluna

== Israel ==
In 2026 the penetration rate was estimated at 109% over a population estimate of over 10 million. The telecom regulator in Israel is Ministry of Communications משרד התקשורת (MOC). As of 2026, there are five mobile network operators across Israel, and over 18 MVNO operators.

Rank	Operator	Technology	Subscribers (in millions)	Ownership
1	Cellcom	GSM-1800 MHz (GPRS, EDGE); 850/2100 MHz UMTS, HSPA; 700/1800/2600 MHz LTE; 3500 MHz 5G NR; Radio network shared with wecom	3.690 (Q2 2026)	DIC (41.77%), Public (58.23%)
2	Partner	GSM-900/1800 MHz (GPRS, EDGE); 900/2100 MHz UMTS, DC-HSPA+ 700/1800/2100/2600 MHz LTE; 3500 MHz 5G NR; Radio network shared with Hot Mobile	2.725 (Q2 2026)	Amphissa Holdings (27%), Public and others (73%)
3	Pelephone	850/2100 MHz UMTS, DC-HSPA+ 700/1800/2600 MHz LTE; 3500 MHz 5G NR	2.707 (Q2 2026)	Bezeq
4	Hot Mobile	800 MHz iDEN; 900/2100 MHz UMTS, DC-HSPA+ 700/1800/2100/2600 MHz LTE; 3500 MHz 5G NR; Radio network shared with Partner	N/A	HOT
5	wecom	1800 MHz LTE; 3500 MHz 5G NR; Radio network shared with Cellcom	N/A	Marathon Telecom Ltd

== Ivory Coast ==
In September 2010 the penetration rate was estimated at 68.5% over a population estimate of 21.5 million.

The telecom regulator in Côte d'Ivoire is Autorité de Régulation des Télécommunications/TIC de Côte d'Ivoire (ARTCI).

Rank	Operator	Technology	Subscribers (in millions)	Ownership
1	Orange	GSM-900 (GPRS, EDGE); 2100 MHz UMTS, DC-HSPA+ LTE	13.531 (Sep 2017)	Orange S.A. (85%), Comafrique (15%)
2	MTN	GSM-900 (GPRS, EDGE); 2100 MHz UMTS, HSDPA LTE	11.173 (Sep 2017)	MTN (64.7%), Planor (25.3%), Teylium group (10%)
3	Moov	GSM (GPRS, EDGE); 2100 MHz UMTS, HSPA+	7.587 (Sep 2017)	Etisalat
4	Koz	GSM-900/1800	2.500 (April 2010)	Comium (licence revoqued)
5	GreenN	GSM-900/1800	0.617 (Q1 2010)	LAP Oricel (licence revoqued)
-	Warid	GSM	Not Yet Available	Warid Telecom (licence revoqued)
-	Mobile Cafe	GSM	Not Yet Available	Aircomm (licence revoqued)
-	YooMee	TD-LTE	Not Yet Available	YooMee

== Jordan ==
In March 2016 the penetration rate was estimated at 140% over a population estimate of 14.09 million.

The telecom regulator in Jordan is Telecommunications Regulatory Commission هيئة تنظيم قطاع الاتصالات (TRC).

Rank	Operator	Technology	Subscribers (in millions)	Ownership
1	Zain Jordan	GSM-900 MHz (GPRS, EDGE); 2100 MHz UMTS, HSPA+, LTE	4.94 (Q1 2016)	Zain Group
2	Orange Jordan	GSM-900 MHz (GPRS, EDGE); 2100 MHz UMTS, HSPA+, LTE	4.59 (Q1 2016)	Orange S.A.
3	Umniah	GSM-1800 MHz (GPRS, EDGE); 2100 MHz UMTS, DC-HSPA+, LTE	4.55 (Q1 2016)	Batelco
Mobile Virtual Network Operators
	Friendi Mobile			
	Virgin Mobile			
	Renna Mobile			

== Kenya ==
The country has 76.16 million subscribers in total, or a 130-145% penetration rate. (Jan 2025)

The telecom regulator in Kenya is Communications Authority of Kenya (CAK).

Rank	Operator	Technology	Subscribers (in millions)	Ownership
1	Safaricom	GSM-900/1800 (GPRS, EDGE); 2100 MHz UMTS, DC-HSPA+, HSUPA; WiMAX; 800/1800 MHz LTE, LTE-A; 5G NR VoLTE	57.0 (May 2025)	Vodacom (55%); Government of Kenya (20%); Public Float (25%)
2	Airtel Kenya (formerly Zain)	GSM-900 (GPRS, EDGE); 2100 MHz UMTS, HSPA+, HSUPA 800/1800 MHz LTE, LTE-A; 5G NR VoLTE	24.5 (2025)	Bharti Airtel (80%)
3	Telkom Kenya (formerly Orange)	GSM-900/1800 (GPRS, EDGE); 2100 MHz UMTS, DC-HSPA+ LTE	3 (2025)	Government of Kenya
4	Jamii Telecommunications (Faiba 4G)	700/1800 MHz LTE, LTE-A VoLTE	0.7 (2025)	Jamii Telecommunications Limited

== Kuwait ==
In September 2010 the penetration rate was estimated at 164.7% over a population estimate of 2.6 million.

The telecom regulator in Kuwait is the Communication and Information Technology Regulatory Authority (CITRA).

Rank	Operator	Technology	Subscribers (in millions)	Ownership
1	Zain	GSM-900/1800 MHz (GPRS, EDGE); 2100 MHz UMTS, HSPA+ 1800 MHz LTE	2.6 (Sep 2014)	Zain Group
2	Ooredoo (formerly Wataniya)	GSM-900/1800 MHz (GPRS, EDGE); 2100 MHz UMTS, HSDPA; 1800 MHz LTE	2.394 (Q2 2014)	Ooredoo (52.5%)
3	Saudi Telecom Company (formerly Viva Kuwait)	GSM-900/1800 MHz (GPRS, EDGE); 2100 MHz UMTS, DC-HSPA+ 1800 MHz LTE	1.106	STC (26%)

== Lebanon ==
In September 2010 the penetration rate was estimated at 65.9% over a population estimate of 4.1 million.

The telecom regulator in Lebanon is Telecommunications Regulatory Authority (TRA).

Rank	Operator	Technology	Subscribers (in millions)	Ownership
1	touch	GSM-900 MHz (GPRS, EDGE); 900/2100 MHz UMTS, HSPA+ 800/1800 MHz LTE, LTE-A	2.4 (Sep 2014)	government - Managed by Ministry of Telecom
2	Alfa	GSM-900 MHz (GPRS, EDGE); 900/2100 MHz UMTS, HSPA+ 800/1800 MHz LTE, LTE-A	1.8 (2014)	government - Managed by Ministry of Telecom

== Lesotho ==
In 2016 the penetration rate was estimated at 86% over a population estimate of 2.2 million.

The telecom regulator in Lesotho is Lesotho Communications Authority (LCA).

Rank	Operator	Technology	Subscribers (in millions)	Ownership
1	Vodacom	GSM-900 MHz (GPRS, EDGE); 2100 MHz UMTS, HSPA; LTE; WiMAX	1.735 (July 2026)	Vodacom (80%), Sekha-Metsi Consortium (20%)
2	Econet Telecom Lesotho	GSM-900 (GPRS, EDGE); 2100 MHz UMTS HSDPA	0.448 (2016)	Econet Ezi Cel Lesotho (Pty)

== Liberia ==
At the end of 2013, the penetration rate was estimated at 68.3% over a population estimate of 3.8 million.

The telecom regulator in Liberia is Liberia Telecommunications Authority (LTA).

Rank	Operator	Technology	Subscribers (in millions)	Ownership
1	Lonestar Cell MTN	GSM-900	1.299 (Sep 2014)	MTN (60%)
2	Orange	GSM-900/1800 (GPRS, EDGE); 2100 MHz UMTS, HSPA+ 1800 MHz LTE	0.997 (end 2013)	Orange Côte d'Ivoire (formerly owned by Cellcom Telecommunications)
3	Novafone (formerly Comium)	GSM-900 (GPRS); 2100 MHz UMTS, DC-HSPA+	0.236 (end 2013)	Comium Services BVI
4	LTC Mobile	?	0.005 (still active)	Liberia Telecommunications Corporation

== Libya ==
In September 2010 the penetration rate was estimated at 169.74% over a population estimate of 6.6 million.

Rank	Operator	Technology	Subscribers (in millions)	Ownership
1	Libyana	GSM-900 MHz (GPRS, EDGE); 2100 MHz UMTS, HSDPA, HSUPA, HSPA, HSPA+, DC-HSPA+ 800/900/1800/2100 MHz 4G, 4G+, LTE, LTE-A; VoLTE, eSIM, 5G(testing)	6.3 (December 2019)	State-owned via LPTIC
2	Almadar Aljadid	GSM-900/1800 MHz (GPRS, EDGE); 2100 MHz UMTS, HSDPA, HSUPA, HSPA, HSPA+, DC-HSPA+ 800/900/1800/2100 MHz 4G, 4G+, LTE, LTE-A; VoLTE, eSIM, 5G	5.0 (December 2019)	State-owned via LPTIC

== Madagascar ==
In 2014 the penetration rate was estimated at 42% (9.7 million) over a population estimate of 23 million.

The telecom regulator in Madagascar is Autorité de Régulation des Technologies de Communication (ARTEC).

Rank	Operator	Technology	Subscribers (in millions)	Ownership
1	Airtel	GSM-900 (GPRS, EDGE); 2100 MHz UMTS, HSPA+ LTE	2.56 (April 2013)	Bharti Airtel
2	Telma Mobile	CdmaOne; GSM-900 (GPRS, EDGE); 2100 MHz UMTS, HSPA LTE	1.98 (April 2013)	Distacom Group, Telma SA, Hiridjee group
3	Orange	GSM-900 (GPRS, EDGE) LTE	1.85 (April 2013)	Orange S.A. (40.01%)
4	Blueline	LTE	N/A	Gulfsat

== Malawi ==
In September 2010 the penetration rate was estimated at 19.32% over a population estimate of 15.9 million.

The telecom regulator in Malawi is Malawi Communications Regulatory Authority (MACRA).

Rank	Operator	Technology	Subscribers (in millions)	Ownership
1	Airtel (formerly Zain)	GSM-900 (GPRS, EDGE); 2100 MHz UMTS, HSPA+ LTE	3.5 (September 2015)	Bharti Airtel
2	TNM	GSM-900/1800 (GPRS, EDGE); 2100 MHz UMTS, HSDPA LTE	2 (July 2013)	Malawi Telecommunications Limited, Telekom Malaysia
3	MTL (Malawi Telecommunications Limited)	LTE-1800		Press Corporation, NICO, Malawi Government
4	Access	GSM-900, LTE-800	0.1	
5	G-Mobile (license revoked)	GSM		Globally Advanced Integrated Networks, Beryl (South Africa)
6	Lacell	GSM		La Cell Private Limited
7	G-Expresso	GSM		Expresso Telecom Group Limited

== Mali ==
The country had 20.2 million subscribers in total (end 2016), or a 113% penetration rate.

The telecom regulator in Mali is Autorité Malienne de Régulation des Télécommunications/TIC et des Postes (AMRTP).

Rank	Operator	Technology	Subscribers (in millions)	Ownership
1	Orange	GSM-900 MHz (GPRS, EDGE); 2100 MHz UMTS, HSPA+	13.1 (end 2016)	Orange S.A. 52.2%
2	Moov Africa Malitel	GSM-900 MHz (GPRS, EDGE); 2100 MHz UMTS, HSDPA	7.1 (end 2016)	Maroc Telecom 51%, local investors 20%, government 19%, staff 10%
3	Planor	GSM	licensed in Jan 2012	Planor (support of Monaco Telecom)

== Mauritania ==
At the end 2020 the penetration rate was estimated at 101% over a population estimate of 4 million.

The telecom regulator in Mauritania is Autorité de Régulation (ARE).

Rank	Operator	Technology	Subscribers (in millions)	Ownership
1	Moov Mauritel	GSM-850 MHz,900 MHz,1800 MHz,1900 MHz UMTS, HSPA+, 4G/LTE	2.600 (Dec 2020)	Maroc Telecom (51.5%)
2	Chinguitel	GSM-850 MHz,900 MHz,1800 MHz,1900 MHz, CDMA, UMTS, HSPA+	1.40 (May 2008)	Sudatel (60%)
3	MATTEL	GSM- 850 MHz,900 MHz,1800 MHz,1900 MHz, UMTS, HSPA+, 4G/LTE	Not Yet Available	Tunisie Telecom (51%), Mauritanian Investors (49%)

== Mauritius ==
The telecom regulator in Mauritius is Information and Communication Technologies Authority of Mauritius (ICTA).

Rank	Operator	Technology	Subscribers (in millions)	Ownership
1	Mauritius Telecom	GSM-900 (EDGE); 2100 MHz UMTS, HSDPA; 1800 MHz LTE	0.628 (Dec 2009)	Orange S.A. (40%)| Government of Mauritius (33.49%)| SBM Investments Managers Ltd (19%)| National Pensions Fund (6.55%)| Employees of Mauritius Telecom (0.96%)
2	Emtel	GSM-900 (EDGE); 2100 MHz UMTS, HSDPA; 1800 MHz LTE	0.437 (Dec 2009)	Currimjee
3	CHiLi	CdmaOne, EvDo, GSM, UMTS	0.318 (March 2019)	Mahanagar Telephone Mauritius Limited (MTML)

== Morocco ==
The country has 58.751 million subscribers in total, or a 159.53% penetration rate. (June 2025)

The telecom regulator in Morocco is Agence Nationale de Réglementation des Telecommunications (ANRT).

Rank	Operator	Technology	Subscribers (in millions)	Ownership
1	Orange Morocco	GSM-900 MHz (GPRS, EDGE); 900/2100 MHz UMTS, HSDPA, DC HSDPA, 800/1800/2100/2600 MHz LTE, LTE-A 700/3500 MHz 5G NR	19.615 (March 2026)	Orange S.A. (49%), FinanceCom+CDG (51%)
2	inwi	GSM-900 MHz (GPRS, EDGE); 2100 MHz UMTS, HSPA+, 800/1800/2600 MHz, LTE, LTE-A 700/3500 MHz 5G NR	19.425 (March 2026)	Zain Group (31%)
3	Maroc Telecom	GSM-900 MHz (GPRS, EDGE); 2100 MHz UMTS, HSDPA, 800/1800/2100/2600 MHz LTE, LTE-A 700/2100/3500 MHz 5G NR	18.019 (March 2026)	Etisalat (53%), Government Morocco (22%)

== Mozambique ==
In September 2010 the penetration rate was estimated at 27.19% over a population estimate of 22.95 million.

The telecom regulator in Mozambique is Instituto Nacional das Comunicações de Moçambique (INCM).

Rank	Operator	Technology	Subscribers (in millions)	Ownership
1	Vodacom	GSM-900/1800 MHz (GPRS, EDGE); 2100 MHz UMTS, HSDPA	11.487 (July 2026)	Vodacom (85%)
2	Tmcel	GSM-900/1800 MHz (GPRS, EDGE); 900/2100 MHz UMTS, HSDPA	5.3	Partially state-owned
3	Movitel	GSM	2 (May 2013)	Viettel (70%), SPI (30%)

== Namibia ==
In December 2016 Namibia had 2.66 million active SIM cards.

The telecom regulator in Namibia is Communications Regulatory Authority of Namibia (CRAN).

Rank	Operator	Technology	Subscribers (in millions)	Ownership
1	MTC	GSM-900/1800 (GPRS, EDGE); 2100 MHz UMTS, HSUPA, HSPA+ 1800 MHz LTE	2.422 (Dec 2016)	Namibia Post and Telecommunications Holdings (66%); Portugal Telecom (34%)
2	TN Mobile (formerly Cell One, Leo)	GSM-900/1800 (GPRS, EDGE); 2100 MHz UMTS, HSDPA LTE	0.187 (Dec 2016)	Telecom Namibia Ltd.

== Niger ==
In September 2024 the penetration rate was estimated at 60.70% over a population estimate of 26.5 million.

The telecom regulator is Autorité de Régulation des Télécommunications et de la Poste (ARTP).

Rank	Operator	Technology	Subscribers (in millions)	Ownership
1	Airtel	GSM-900/1800 (GPRS, EDGE); UMTS, HSUPA, HSPA+ LTE	7.32	Bharti Airtel
2	Niger Telecoms	GSM-900/1800 (GPRS, EDGE); UMTS, HSUPA, HSPA+ LTE	0.87	Sahel-Com, Lap Green overtaken by government
3	Zamani Telecom	GSM-900/1800 (GPRS, EDGE); 2100 MHz UMTS, HSDPA	4.13	Zamani Com
4	Moov Africa Niger	GSM-900	3.76	Maroc Telecom

== Nigeria ==
The telecom regulator in Nigeria is Nigerian Communications Commission.

Rank	Operator	Technology	Subscribers (in millions)	Ownership
1	MTN	GSM-900/1800 (GPRS, EDGE); 2100 MHz UMTS, HSDPA LTE	74.04 (May 2021)	MTN (41.5%)
2	Airtel (formerly Econet, Vodago, Vmobile, Celtel, Zain)	GSM-900/1800 (GPRS, EDGE); 2100 MHz UMTS, DC-HSPA+ LTE	50.02 (May 2021)	Bharti Airtel (20.6%)
3	Glo Mobile	GSM-900/1800 (GPRS, EDGE); 2100 MHz UMTS, HSDPA LTE	49.78 (May 2021)	Globacom (20.78%)
4	T2 (formerly Etisalat, 9mobile)	GSM-900/1800 (GPRS, EDGE); 2100 MHz UMTS, DC-HSPA+ LTE	12.84 (May 2021)	LH Telecommunication (95.50%)
5	ntel (formerly NITEL, mtel)	LTE		NatCom Development & Investment
6	mcom	5G		Mafab Communications

== Oman ==
In late 2025 the penetration rate was estimated at 125% over a population estimate of 5.54 million.

The telecom regulator in Oman is Telecommunications Regulatory Authority هيئة تنظيم الاتصالات (TRA).

Rank	Operator	Technology	Subscribers (in millions)	Ownership
1	Omantel	GSM-900 MHz (GPRS, EDGE); 900/2100 MHz UMTS, HSPA+ 1800 MHz FD-LTE, 2300 MHz TD-LTE	7.1 (2024)	Omantel (99%)
2	Ooredoo (formerly Nawras)	GSM-900 MHz (GPRS, EDGE); 900/2100 MHz UMTS, DC-HSPA+ 800/1800 MHz FD-LTE, 2300 MHz TD-LTE	2.79 (Q1 2023)	Ooredoo (55%)
3	Vodafone	GSM-900 (GPRS, EDGE); 2100 MHz UMTS, HSDPA; 1800 MHz LTE; WiMAX	1.5 (2025)	Vodafone

== Palestine ==
In September 2010 the penetration rate was estimated at 97.5% over a population estimate of 2.5 million.

The telecom regulator in Palestine is Palestinian Telecommunications Regulatory Authority (PTRA).

Rank	Operator	Technology	Subscribers (in millions)	Ownership
1	Jawwal	GSM-900 MHz (GPRS, EDGE) 2100 MHz UMTS, HSPA+	2.45 (Q1 2012)	Paltel
2	Ooredoo	GSM-900/1800 MHz (GPRS, EDGE) 2100 MHz UMTS, HSPA+	0.679 (Q2 2014)	Ooredoo (57%), Palestine Investment Fund (43%)

== Qatar ==
As of Q3 2022, Qatar had 4.5 million active mobile subscribers in total.

The telecom regulator in Qatar is Communications Regulatory Authority (CRA).

Rank	Operator	Technology	Subscribers (in millions)	Ownership
1	Ooredoo (formerly Qtel)	GSM-900/1800 MHz (GPRS, EDGE); 2100 MHz UMTS, HSPA+ 800/1800/2600 MHz LTE, LTE-A	2.5 (Q3 2022)	Ooredoo
2	Vodafone	GSM-900/1800 MHz (GPRS, EDGE); 2100 MHz UMTS, HSDPA; 800/1800/2600 MHz LTE, LTE-A	2.0 (Q3 2022)	Qatar Foundation LLC (50%), Pension Fund (13.05%), free float (36.95%)

== Réunion ==
This French overseas territory has ? million subscribers in total, or a 74.7% penetration rate. (2008)

The telecom regulator in La Réunion is Autorité de Régulation des Communications Electroniques et des Postes (ARCEP).

Rank	Operator	Technology	Subscribers (in millions)	Ownership
1	SFR	GSM-900 MHz (GPRS, EDGE); 2100 MHz UMTS, DC-HSPA+ LTE	Not Yet Available	SFR
2	Orange	GSM-900/1800 MHz (GPRS, EDGE); 2100 MHz UMTS, DC-HSPA+ LTE	Not Yet Available	Orange
3	FREE	GSM-900/1800 MHz (GPRS, EDGE); 2100 MHz UMTS, HSDPA	Not Yet Available	fr: ILIAD and TELCO OI

== Rwanda ==
In December 2013 the penetration rate was estimated at 63.5% over a population estimate of 11.4 million.

The telecom regulator in Rwanda is Rwanda Utilities Regulatory Agency (RURA).

Rank	Operator	Technology	Subscribers (in millions)	Ownership
1	MTN Rwanda	GSM-900 (GPRS, EDGE); 2100 MHz UMTS, HSPA+ LTE	3.65 (Dec 2017)	MTN Group (55%), Crystal Telecom (35%)
2	Airtel	GSM-900/1800 (GPRS, EDGE); 2100 MHz UMTS, HSPA+ LTE	~5.00 (Dec 2017)	Bharti Airtel
-	Rwandatel	CdmaOne; GSM-900/1800; 2100 MHz UMTS	(license revoked Apr 2011)	LAP Green Networks (80%)

== Saint Helena ==
As of the 2021 census, 73.7% of households reported having access to at least one mobile phone, and 66.0% reported having access to the internet.

Rank	Operator	Technology	Subscribers (in millions)	Ownership
1	Sure	GSM-900 LTE 1800 MHz	Not Yet Available	Batelco

== São Tomé and Príncipe ==
In 2025, the penetration rate was estimated at 61.5% over a population estimate of 0.21 million.

The telecom regulator in São Tomé and Príncipe is Autoridade Geral de Regulação (AGER).

Rank	Operator	Technology	Subscribers (in millions)	Ownership
1	CST	GSM-900 (GPRS, EDGE); 2100 MHz UMTS, HSPA+ LTE	Not Yet Available	Portugal Telecom (51%)

== Saudi Arabia ==
In September 2010 the penetration rate was estimated at 162.6% over a population estimate of 26.1 million.

The telecom regulator in Saudi Arabia is Communications and Information Technology Commission هيئة الاتصالات وتقنية المعلومات (CITC).

Rank	Operator	Technology	Subscribers (in millions)	Ownership
1	stc	2G :GSM-900/1800 (GPRS, EDGE); 3G :900/2100 MHz UMTS, DC-HSPA+ 4G FD-LTE :700/1800/2100 MHz; 4G TD-LTE :2300 MHz 5G NR:3500 MHz	19.914 (Q3 2010)	70% state owned and 30% private
2	Mobily	2G : GSM-900/1800 (GPRS, EDGE); 3G :900/2100 MHz UMTS, HSPA+ 4G TD-LTE:2600 MHz; 4G FD-LTE:800/1800/2100 MHz	15.06 (Q3 2010)	Etisalat (27.45%)
3	Zain	2G:GSM-900/1800 (GPRS, EDGE); 3G:900/2100 MHz UMTS, HSPA+ 4G FD-LTE:800/900/1800/2100 MHz LTE, LTE-A	11.40 (Dec 2015)	Zain Group (37%)
4	Virgin mobile KSA	GSM-900/1800 (GPRS, EDGE); 2100 MHz UMTS, DC-HSPA+ 1800 MHz FD-LTE, 2300 MHz TD-LTE	2.8 (2017)	
5	Lebara Mobile KSA	GSM-900/1800 (GPRS, EDGE); 2100 MHz UMTS, HSPA+ 1800 MHz FD-LTE, 2600 MHz TD-LTE		Lebara

== Senegal ==
At the end of December 2015 the penetration rate was estimated at 110,74%, over a population estimate of 13,5 millions.

The telecom regulator in Senegal is Autorité de Régulation des Télécommunications et des Postes (ARTP).

Rank	Operator	Technology	Subscribers (in millions)	Ownership
1	Orange	GSM-900; 2100 MHz UMTS LTE	9.936 (31 Dec 2015)	Sonatel, Orange S.A. (52.2%)
2	Free	GSM-900; UMTS, HSPA+ LTE	3.355 (31 Dec 2015)	Teyliom, NJJ and AXIAN
3	Expresso	CDMA; GSM-900/1800; UMTS	3.188 (31 Dec 2015)	Sudatel
4	Hayo Telecom	CDMA; GSM-900/1800; UMTS	0.483 (31 Dec 2015)	CSU

== Seychelles ==
In 2024 the penetration rate was estimated at 88% over a population estimate of 0.13 million.

The telecom regulator in Seychelles is Department of Information Communications Technology (ICT).

Rank	Operator	Technology	Subscribers (in millions)	Ownership
1	Airtel	GSM-900 MHz (GPRS, EDGE); 2100 MHz UMTS, HSDPA LTE	0.065	Bharti Airtel
2	Cable & Wireless	GSM-900 MHz	0.076	Cable & Wireless

== Sierra Leone ==
The country has 0.8 million subscribers in total, or a 13.23% penetration rate. (2007)

The telecom regulator in Sierra Leone is National Telecommunications Commission (NATCOM).

Rank	Operator	Technology	Subscribers (in millions)	Ownership
1	Africell	GSM-900; UMTS	2.9 (Feb 2015)	Lintel Limited
2	Orange	GSM-900 (GPRS, EDGE); 2100 MHz UMTS, HSDPA LTE	0.644 (Feb 2012)	Orange
3	Sierratel	CDMA	Not Yet Available	government, managed by MDIC
4	Qcell	GSM-900 (GPRS, EDGE); 2100 MHz UMTS, HSDPA		Qcell
	Comium	GSM-900/1800; WiMAX	0.650 (2009)	Comium licence revoked since October 2014, while NATCOM managers have been sacked in 2015
	GreenN	GSM	Not Yet Available	Ambitel (LapGreen) licence revoked since September 2014

== Somalia ==
At the start of 2025, there were 11.3 million total subscribers, with a 58.3 penetration rate

The telecom regulator in Somalia is the National Communications Authority of Somalia (NCA).

Rank	Operator	Technology	Subscribers (in millions)	Ownership
1	Hormuud	GSM-900 (GPRS, EDGE); 2100 MHz UMTS, HSPA+ LTE	2.38 (Q4 2015)	Hormuud Telecom Somalia Inc
2	Telcom Somalia	GSM; 2100 MHz UMTS LTE	1.00 (Q4 2015)	Haatif Telecom Somalia
3	Telesom Mobile	GSM; 2100 MHz UMTS	0.80 (Q4 2015)	Telesom Group
4	Nationlink	GSM-900	0.71 (Q4 2015)	Bintel
5	Somtel	GSM-900/1800 (GPRS, EDGE); 2100 MHz UMTS, HSDPA LTE	0.46 (Q4 2015)	Dahabshiil
6	Golis Telecom Somalia	GSM-900	0.24 (Q4 2015)	Golis Telecom Somalia, Gaani Wireless
7	Somafone	GSM-900	0.20 (Q4 2015)	Somali Telecom Group
8	Netco	GSM-900	Not Yet Available	Somali Telecom Group
9	SomNet	GSM-900; LTE	Not Yet Available	SomNet Telecom

== South Africa ==
In September 2010 the penetration rate was estimated at 99.6% over a population estimate of 49 million.

The telecom regulator in South Africa is Independent Communications Authority of South Africa (ICASA).

Rank	Operator	Technology	Subscribers (in millions)	Ownership
1	Vodacom	GSM-900 (GPRS, EDGE); 2100 MHz UMTS, DC-HSPA+ 1800 MHz LTE 5G 3500 MHz; WiMAX	48.722 (July 2026)	Vodacom (65.1%)
2	MTN	GSM-900/1800 (GPRS, EDGE); 900/2100 MHz UMTS, DC-HSPA+ 1800 MHz LTE 5G 3500 MHz	29.028 (August 2020)	MTN Group
3	Cell C	GSM-900/1800 (GPRS, EDGE); 900/2100 MHz UMTS, DC-HSPA+ 1800/2100 MHz LTE, LTE-A	14.407 (Mar 2020)	Oger Telecom in process of diluting its 70% stake to 27% Blue Label Telecoms is planning to acquire a 30% stake in Cell C
4	Telkom	GSM-1800 (GPRS); 2100 MHz UMTS, HSPA+ 2300 MHz LTE	4.0 (March 2017)	Telkom
5	Rain	1800 MHz LTE 5G 3500 MHz		Rain (formerly Wireless Business Solutions) 80% ARC 20%

== South Sudan ==
The country has 1 million subscribers in total, or an 8% penetration rate.

The telecom regulator in South Sudan is Ministry of Telecommunication and Postal Services (MOTPS).

Rank	Operator	Technology	Subscribers (in millions)	Ownership
1	MTN	GSM-900/1800 MHz (GPRS, EDGE); 2100 MHz UMTS, HSDPA, LTE	0.787 (Sep 2014)	MTN Group
2	Zain	GSM-900/1800 MHz (GPRS, EDGE); 2100 MHz UMTS, HSPA+, LTE	0.664 (Sep 2014)	Zain Group
3	Digitel	GSM-900/1800 MHz (GPRS); 2100 MHz UMTS, HSDPA, LTE	Not Yet Available	Digitel Holding Ltd.

== Sudan ==
In September 2010 the penetration rate was estimated at 42.3% over a population estimate of 45 million.

The telecom regulator in Sudan is National Telecommunication Corporation (NTC).

Rank	Operator	Technology	Subscribers (in millions)	Ownership
1	Zain	GSM-900 MHz (GPRS, EDGE); 2100 MHz UMTS, HSPA+, LTE	11.095 (Sep 2014)	Zain Group
2	MTN	GSM-900/1800 MHz (GPRS, EDGE); 2100 MHz UMTS, HSDPA, LTE	8.474 (Sep 2014)	MTN Group (85%)
3	Sudani	CDMA; GSM-1800 MHz (GPRS); 2100 MHz UMTS, HSDPA, HSUPA	Not Yet Available	Sudatel
4	Canar	CdmaOne	Not Yet Available	Bank of Khartoum (100%)

== Syria ==
In September 2010 the penetration rate was estimated at 46.6% over a population estimate of 22.5 million.

The telecom regulator in Syria is Syrian Telecommunication Regulatory Authority (SyTRA).

Rank	Operator	Technology	Subscribers (in millions)	Ownership
1	Zain Syria (formerly MTN Syria)	GSM-900 MHz (GPRS, EDGE); 2100 MHz UMTS, HSDPA, LTE	N/A	Zain Group (75%)
2	Syriatel	GSM-900 MHz (GPRS, EDGE); 2100 MHz UMTS, HSPA+, LTE	N/A	Rami Makhlouf

== Tanzania ==
In March 2020 the penetration rate was estimated at 86% over a population estimate of 51 million.

The telecom regulator in Tanzania is Tanzania Communications Regulatory Authority (TCRA).

Rank	Operator	Technology	Subscribers (in millions)	Ownership
1	Vodacom	GSM-900/1800 MHz (GPRS, EDGE); 2100 MHz UMTS, HSPA+ LTE 5G NR	28.612 (July 2026)	Vodacom (75%)
2	Airtel (formerly Zain)	GSM-900/1800 (GPRS, EDGE); 2100 MHz UMTS, HSPA+ LTE 5G NR	13.39 (March 2020)	Bharti Airtel (51%)
3	Tigo	GSM-900/1800 MHz (GPRS, EDGE); 2100 MHz UMTS, DC-HSPA+ LTE 5G NR	12.64 (March 2020)	Axian Group
4	Halotel	GSM; UMTS LTE	5.5	Viettel Tanzania Limited (Subsidiary of Viettel Group)
5	Zantel	GSM-900/1800 MHz (GPRS, EDGE); 2100 MHz UMTS, HSPA+	0.93 (March 2020)	Etisalat (51%) and Zanzibar Telecom Ltd

== Togo ==
In June 2014 the penetration rate was estimated at 60.7% over a population estimate of 7.2 million.

The telecom regulator in Togo is Autorité de Règlementation des secteurs de Postes et de Télécommunications (ARTP).

Rank	Operator	Technology	Subscribers (in millions)	Ownership
1	Togocel	GSM-900 MHz (GPRS, EDGE); 2100 MHz UMTS, HSPA+	2.751 (Q4 2014)	Togo Telecom (state owned)
2	Moov Africa Togo	GSM-900 MHz (GPRS, EDGE)	1.648 (Q4 2014)	Maroc Telecom

== Tunisia ==
The country has 15.4 million subscribers in total, or about 128.2% penetration rate. (Q3 2025)

The telecom regulator in Tunisia is Instance Nationale des Télécommunications (INT).

Rank	Operator	Technology	Subscribers (in millions)	Ownership
1	Ooredoo (formerly Tunisiana)	GSM-900/1800 MHz (GPRS, EDGE); 900/2100 MHz UMTS, HSPA+, DC-HSPA+ LTE	6,936,000 (Q3 2025)	Ooredoo (75%)
2	Tunisie Telecom	GSM-900/1800 MHz (GPRS, EDGE); 2100 MHz UMTS, DC-HSPA+ LTE	4,501,000 (Q3 2025)	Tunisie Télécom Group (65%), Tecom DIG (35%)
3	Orange	GSM-900/1800 MHz (GPRS, EDGE); 2100 MHz UMTS, DC-HSPA+ LTE	4,009,000 (Q3 2025)	Orange S.A., Divona

== Türkiye ==
Turkey has 91.3 million subscribers in total, or a 107.1% penetration rate. (Q2 2023)

The telecom regulator in Turkey is Information and Communication Technologies Authority (BTK : Bilgi Teknolojileri ve Iletisim Kurumu).

Rank	Operator	Technology	Subscribers (in millions)	Ownership
1	Turkcell	GSM 900 MHz (GPRS, EDGE); 900/2100 MHz UMTS, HSDPA, HSUPA, HSPA, HSPA+, DC-HSPA+, 3C-HSDPA; 800/900/1800/2100/2600 MHz LTE, LTE-A, LTE-A Pro; VoLTE, VoWiFi; 700 MHz ve 3,5 GHz 5G	37.64 (Q2 2023)	Turkey Wealth Fund (26.2%), LetterOne (19.8%), free float (54%)
2	Türk Telekom (Formerly Avea, Aria, Aycell)	GSM 900 (only in rural areas)/1800 MHz (GPRS, EDGE); 900/2100 MHz UMTS, HSDPA, HSUPA, HSPA, HSPA+, DC-HSPA+ 800/900/1800/2100/2600 MHz LTE, LTE-A, LTE-A Pro; VoLTE, VoWiFi; 700 MHz ve 3,5 GHz 5G	25.61 (Q2 2023)	Türk Telekom
3	Vodafone (Formerly Telsim)	GSM 900 MHz (GPRS, EDGE); 2100 MHz UMTS, HSDPA, HSUPA, HSPA, HSPA+, DC-HSPA+ 800/900/1800/2100/2600 MHz LTE, LTE-A, LTE-A Pro; VoLTE, VoWiFi; 700 MHz ve 3,5 GHz 5G	25.351 (Q1 2027)	Vodafone Group plc

== Uganda ==
In September 2010 the penetration rate was estimated at 30.78% over a population estimate of 34.6 million.

The telecom regulator in Uganda is Uganda Communications Commission (UCC).

Rank	Operator	Technology	Subscribers (in millions)	Ownership
1	MTN Uganda	CDMA; GSM-900 MHz (GPRS, EDGE); 2100 MHz UMTS, DC-HSPA+ 2600 MHz TD-LTE; WiMAX	10.181 (September 2014)	MTN Group (96%)
2	Airtel Uganda	GSM-900 MHz (GPRS, EDGE); 2100 MHz UMTS, HSPA+	4.6 (April 2013)	Bharti Airtel
3	UTel	CdmaOne; GSM-900 MHz (GPRS, EDGE); 2100 MHz UMTS, HSDPA	1.0 (July 2016)	Uganda Telecommunications Corporation Limited
4	Smile Telecom (Uganda)			
5	Lycamobile			

== United Arab Emirates ==
As of June 2023, the total number of active mobile subscriptions was 20.3 million.

The telecom regulator in United Arab Emirates is Telecommunications Regulatory Authority الهيئة العامة لتنظيم قطاع الاتصالات (TRA).

Rank	Operator	Technology	Subscribers (in millions)	Ownership
1	Etisalat	GSM-900 MHz (GPRS, EDGE); 900 MHz UMTS, DC-HSPA+ 800/1800/2100/2600/3500 MHz LTE, LTE-A, 5G NR	10.8 (July 2019)	UAE Federal Government (40%) and public shareholders (60%)
2	du	GSM-900/1800 MHz (GPRS, EDGE); 2100 MHz UMTS, DC-HSPA+ 800/1800/2100/2600/3500 MHz LTE, LTE-A, 5G NR	7.9 (2022)	UAE Federal Government (39.5%), Mubadala Development Company (19.75%), TECOM Investments (19.5%), and public shareholders (21.25%)
Mobile Virtual Network Operators
3	Virgin Mobile (using du)			Virgin Mobile

== Yemen ==
In 2024 the penetration rate was estimated at 18% over a population estimate of 40 million. Because of unreliable coverage of mobile services in certain areas, particularly in rural areas, it is common for Yemenis to utilize a phone with Dual SIM capability.

The telecom regulator in Yemen is the Public Telecommunication Corporation.

Rank	Operator	Mobile Prefix	Technology	Subscribers (in millions)	Ownership
1	Yemen Mobile	+967-77	CDMA2000/1xEVDO-RevA (800 MHz); 4G LTE FDD: Bands 3, 20, 28 (700/800/1800 MHz)	9.5 (2021)	Government-run company with shareholders.
2	Sabafon	+967-71	GSM 900 MHz	6 (2021)	Al-Ahmar Group; Batelco; Hayel Saeed Anam & Co. Ltd. Consolidated Constructors International company S.A.L. (CCC)
3	YOU (formerly, MTN)	+967-73	GSM 900 MHz	4.7 (2021)	Emerald International Investment, a subsidiary of the Zubair Corporation
4	Y Telecom (formerly HiTS-UNITEL)	+967-70	GSM 900 MHz	Unknown	Formerly, owned by Saudi and Kuwaiti corporations. Currently owned by the family of Abdrabbuh Mansur Hadi
5	Yemen 4G يمن فورجي	+967-10	4G LTE FDD: Bands 3, 20, 28 (700/800/1800 MHz)		المؤسسة العامة للاتصالات السلكية واللاسلكية

== Zambia ==
In December 2011 the penetration rate was estimated at 62% over a population estimate of 13.9 million.

The telecom regulator in Zambia is Zambia Information & Communications Technology Authority (ZICTA).

Rank	Operator	Technology	Subscribers (in millions)	Ownership
1	MTN	GSM-900 MHz (GPRS, EDGE); 2100 MHz UMTS, DC-HSPA+ LTE	4.447 (Sep 2014)	MTN Group
2	Airtel	GSM-900 MHz (GPRS, EDGE); 2100 MHz UMTS, HSPA+ LTE	4.04 (May 2014)	Bharti Airtel (78.88%)
3	Zamtel	GSM-900 MHz (GPRS, EDGE); 2100 MHz UMTS, HSPA+	1.2 (Dec 2011)	Zambia Telecommunications Company Ltd

== Zimbabwe ==
By December 2025, the penetration rate was estimated at 107.4% over a population estimate of 17.2 million.

The telecom regulator in Zimbabwe is Postal and Telecommunications Regulatory Authority of Zimbabwe (POTRAZ).

Rank	Operator	Technology	Subscribers (in millions)	Ownership
1	Econet	GSM-900 (GPRS, EDGE); 2100 MHz UMTS, HSDPA; 1800 MHz LTE; WiMAX	12.374 (December 2025)	Econet Wireless (Private) Limited
2	telecel	GSM-900 (GPRS, EDGE); 2100 MHz UMTS, HSDPA	4.101 (December 2025)	State-owned
3	NetOne	GSM-900 (GPRS, EDGE); 2100 MHz UMTS, HSDPA; 1800 MHz LTE WiMAX	0.303 (December 2025)	NetOne Cellular (Pvt) Ltd (government)

== See also ==
- List of mobile network operators worldwide
- List of mobile network operators of the Americas
  - List of mobile network operators of the Caribbean
- List of mobile network operators in Europe
- List of mobile network operators in Asia and Oceania
- List of telecommunications regulatory bodies
- Mobile country code
