= Mobile money in Somalia =

Mobile money in Somalia refers to the system of digital financial services that enables people to send, receive, and store money electronically. It has become a cornerstone of the country’s economy, facilitating payments, remittances, and other financial transactions in a context where traditional banking infrastructure is limited.

== History ==
In 2009, Hormuud, Golis Telecom, and Telesom introduced mobile money into Somalia. It was known as Zaad by Hormuud and Telesom, and Sahal by Golis. Telesom operated in Somaliland, Golis operated in Puntland and Hormuud operated in the rest of southern Somalia. In 2011, Hormuud Telecom introduced EVC+ which rapidly gained traction, becoming the most used digital payments system in the country. In 2012, mobile money was slowly gaining traction, almost 40% of Telesom’s subscribers were using Zaad.

In 2014, studies had revealed that about 37% of Somali adults had a mobile money account, and mobile money was slowly becoming an important way to store money, more adults had a mobile money account than a bank account. In late 2014, Dahabshil Group also launched their own mobile money service called e-Dahab. By 2017, mobile money in Somalia had experienced a tremendous boom, with about 3/4 of the population over age 16 using mobile money services. In 2021, the Central Bank of Somalia issued its first mobile money licence to Hormuud, officially formalising the industry under national regulation and integrating it into the national financial system. Premier Bank also introduced their new mobile money service called Premier Wallet in this year.

In 2025, Somalia launched its first nationwide instant payment system (SIPS) powered by BPC’s SmartVista platform with QR payments via the SOMQR standard, while Hormuud Telecom’s EVC Plus was re-certified by GSMA for secure mobile money services. Hormuud Telecom also strengthened its EVC Plus mobile‑money platform by partnering with various banks, allowing users to access banking services directly from their mobile wallets, effectively starting the process of uniting mobile money and traditional banking systems.

On 31 March 2026, Hormuud Telecom signed a MoU with the German development agency GIZ to support Somalia’s digital economy, with a focus on enhancing cross-border mobile payment systems and AI. The Central bank of Somalia announced on the same day that Somalia had officially joined the Pan-African Payment and Settlement System (PAPSS), enabling faster and more efficient payment transactions within Africa by linking Somalia’s financial system with regional payment networks. The bank said the move forms part of broader efforts to modernise Somalia’s financial infrastructure and align it with international standards.

== Key providers ==
- Zaad (Telesom) – operates in Somaliland.
- SAHAL (Golis) – operates in Puntland.
- EVC Plus (Hormuud) – operates mainly in southern and central Somalia.
- eDahab (Dahabshil) – operates in all of Somalia.
- Other smaller providers – include NationLink, Somtel, and regional operators.

== Usage and adoption ==
=== 2009-2012 ===
Mobile money was gradually introduced in Somalia during this period. The number of P2P transfers on ZAAD grew at an annualised rate of ~42.7% around 2012. Transactions were made in USD.

=== 2012-2014 ===
By March 2013, Telesom's ZAAD users were performing an average of nearly 25 P2P transfers and over 6 bill payments per month. The frequency of cash-ins and cash-outs had declined compared to 2010 indicating that ZAAD was increasingly being used as a cash-replacement tool.

By 2014, roughly 35% of Somali adults had a mobile money account, one of the highest rates in Africa at the time, more adults reported having a mobile money account than a bank account.

As of June 2014, Telesom had 450,000 registered mobile money users, with 31% of them being women, up from 17% in June 2010.

=== 2014-2017 ===
In 2017, the World Bank and Altai Consulting carried out the largest study to date on mobile money usage in Somalia. The research covered Somaliland, Puntland and southern Somalia, the findings pointed to a profound transformation underway in Somalia’s digital economy:

==== Overall ====
- 73% of Somali adults used mobile money services divided by 83% in urban areas, 72% is rural areas and 55% in nomadic communities
- Active usage stood at 71.6%
- More than half of the country received their monthly salaries in mobile money accounts and 63% of users kept all their funds on their phone rather than cashing out
- Mobile money had a 92% satisfaction rate

==== Gender ====
- 75.4% of men had a mobile money account compared to 70.4% for women
- 74.5% of men actively used mobile money services compared to 68.7% for women

==== Age ====
- Among 16–25 years old, penetration stood at 75.1% and active usage stood at 73.7%
- Among 26=35 years old, penetration stood at 78.2% and active usage at 77.4%
- Among 36–50 years old, penetration stood at 69.2% and active usage at 67.1%
- Among 50+ years old, penetration stood at 57.2% and active usage at 56.7%

==== Literacy ====
- Among the literate population, penetration stood at 81.3% and active usage at 80.6%
- Among the illiterate population, penetration stood at 54.8% and active usage at 52.1%

==== Education ====
- Among the higher level education population, penetration stood at 82.7% and active usage at 82.4%
- Among the lower level education population, penetration stood at 64.3% and active usage at 62%

==== Monthly Income ====
- Among less than $100 earners, penetration stood at 59.3% and active usage at 57.9%
- Among $100 to $150 earners, penetration stood at 59.8% and active usage at 58.3%
- Among $150 to $200 earners, penetration stood at 65.7% and active usage at 64.9%
- Among $200 to $250 earners, penetration stood at 81.6% and active usage at 81.2%
- Among $250 to $300 earners, penetration stood at 85.8% and active usage at 82.8%
- Among $300 to $500 earners, penetration stood at 88.9% and active usage at 88.8%
- Among more than $500 earners, penetration stood at 96.9% and active usage at 96.9%

=== 2017-Present day ===
During this period, Somali telecoms faced major challenges shifting from USSD-based feature phones to smartphones. In 2019, most of the population owned feature phones, and limited internet access made it hard for companies to earn from online services. Telecoms like Hormuud began to invest in fiber to support and expand 4G and 5G networks. Hormuud Telecom had pledged to ensure full 4G coverage across Somalia by 2023.

As of 2021, it was estimated that over 11.25 million Somalis, or 70% of Somalia's population, had access to 4G internet. In 2023, approximately 89% of the Somali population used mobile money services, compared to just 8.8% who had access to formal banking services. In March 2024, Hormuud launched 5G in major cities, including Mogadishu, Kismayo, Galkayo, and Baidoa, offering free 4G upgrades for some customers and an unlimited data plan for $20/month. Hormuud also provides the cheapest 4G mobile internet in Africa and the Arab world.

== Economic impact ==
In many places in Somalia, local physical cash (Somali Shillings) has become increasingly scarce. While this is partly due to hard cash being superseded by mobile money, it is also reflective of the state’s limited capacity to print new banknotes.

Despite the Central Bank having stopped issuing currency, new Somali shilling notes continued to appear and were never officially authorized. Even so, these unofficial notes are still widely accepted and used in everyday transactions, especially for small purchases and routine cash needs. Estimates from the IMF and Somalia’s Central Bank put the share of "counterfeit" Somali shilling notes at about 95–98% of all SOS notes in circulation.

Following state collapse, Somalia experienced an unusual economic transition, with people adapting to an informal, decentralized system that functioned despite the absence of a central authority. Private businesses quickly adapted to challenges, sustaining trade, banking, and financial systems, and in some areas, even improving economic activity.

Studies found that the introduction of mobile money in Somalia increased consumer spending and economic output, benefiting small and medium-sized enterprises (SMEs), and improving overall economic efficiency. The widespread adoption of digital financial services in Somalia, notably in rural and remote areas, has not only facilitated financial inclusion but also served as a lifeline in the absence of a stable and accessible conventional banking system, only 15% of Somalis have a bank account compared to 5% in rural areas.

Somalia is a largely dollarized economy, and its mobile money sector operates only in USD.

In 2017, Somalia’s mobile money system handled approximately $2.7 billion in monthly transactions. These were distributed as:

- 30.4% P2P transfers
- 30% salaries (disbursements)
- 14.9% bill payments
- 14.1% merchant payments
- 4.4% airtime top-ups
- 6.3% international remittances

Only transactions reflecting actual production, salaries, merchant payments, and airtime top-ups contributed to GDP, totaling about $1.2 billion per month or roughly $14.4 billion annually. This accounted for 36% of Somalia’s estimated largely informal GDP, which implies a total GDP of around $40 billion and a GDP per capita of about $2850 in 2017.

== Regulations and governance ==
During the first decade of the sector's rapid expansion, mobile money was unregulated and operators were not required to maintain 100% of their e-money liabilities in liquid assets. Although regulation on the part of Somalia's Central Bank in 2019 and GSMA certification in 2022 have required parity between electronic and cash reserves, and have in theory introduced some consumer protections, the availability of such a ‘float’ of cash for more than a decade has allowed the telecommunications companies to cement their position in the wider economy through investment in other businesses. According to a senior official in the Ministry of planning :

"If Hormuud was doing telecommunication, it was also in banking, energy and agriculture. Hormuud was just taking over the whole country because there was no regulation restricting them from going into other sectors. For example, it was difficult for small companies to break into a sector like energy … because they could not compete with Hormuud."

Even though the capacities of the Central Bank have improved, its monitoring and regulation of the financial sector remains limited, leaving the sector largely deregulated.

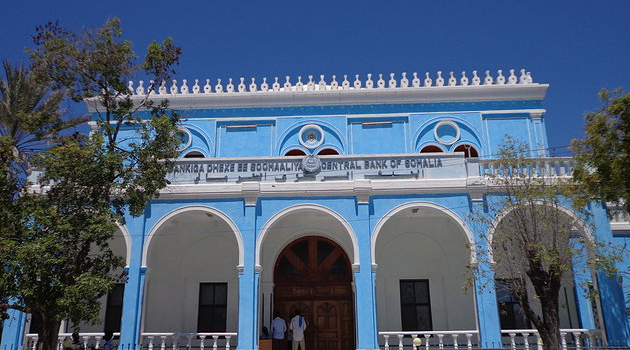
Central Bank of Somalia, Mogadishu

== Security risks ==
Al-Shabaab has historically used Somalia’s mobile phone and mobile money networks to collect taxes, often through threatening messages or calls, allowing payments from areas outside its direct control. In 2018, the group’s annual tax revenue was estimated at around $27 million, rising to approximately $150 million by 2023, reflecting its growing financial capacity. The Somali government has attempted to curb this activity, freezing 320 bank and mobile accounts in 2022–2023, but these measures capture only a small fraction of the group’s overall income.

To curb Al‑Shabaab’s exploitation of mobile money services, the Somali government has taken several concrete measures. In 2023, Somalia passed a Targeted Financial Sanctions (TFS) Law, which allows the freezing of assets of individuals and entities linked to extremism. Its AML/CFT (anti‑money laundering / counter‑terrorist financing) legal framework was also strengthened via reforms, giving more power to the Financial Reporting Centre to detect and prosecute illicit mobile money transactions. Somali authorities reportedly shut down around 3,000 mobile wallets linked to extortion or illicit flows between 2022 and 2025. Under the Central Bank of Somalia’s amended Mobile Money Regulations, providers are required to perform customer due diligence (KYC), set transaction limits, monitor transactions for suspicious activity, and regularly report to the Financial Reporting Center.

In January 2026, Hormuud Telecom enabled a feature on its EVC platform displaying recipients full names before transactions, reversing years of anonymous transfers. By 2026, all SIM cards will also have to be linked to a National ID issued by NIRA, strengthening financial transparency and oversight.
