= Telcom (Somalia) =

- Company type: Private
- Industry: Telecommunications
- Headquarters: Mogadishu, Somalia
- Key people: Melik Ben Kauffrau
- Products: Broadband, mobile services, fixed line
- Number of employees: 750
- Website: www.telcom-somalia.com

Telcom is a telecommunications network operator serving Somalia and Somaliland. It is the first major privately owned company providing telecommunications services to cities nationwide.

== Overview ==
Telcom is headquartered in Bakaara Market, Mogadishu. It has representative offices in Dubai, UAE and in London, UK, where accounting, international relations and carrier services are handled. Its chairman is Mohamed Sheikh, with Said Olow as general manager, Hassan Ibrahim Mursal as chief technical officer and Omar Hussein Adan serving as chief transmission officer. There are 750 staff. It has three dependent networks in Mogadishu, Hargeisa and Bosaso, while there is an interconnectivity link among all of them.

== See also ==
- Somtel
- Golis Telecom Somalia
- Hormuud Telecom
- NationLink Telecom
- Netco (Somalia)
- Somafone
- Somali Telecom Group
