= Somali Telecom Group =

Somali Telecom Group ; (STG) is a telecommunications company based in Somalia. It was founded in 1993 in Rockville, Maryland, in the United States, by Abdirazak. Osman, Edmund L. Resor, Abdiaziz Ismail Dualeh and Luis F. George. According to the company's website's front page, it is Somalia's "first telecom service provider". STG maintains offices in 10 Somali cities; its head offices are currently located in Dubai.

== History ==
After its founding in 1993, STG built telecom service accordingly:

- 1994: Bosasso - (North East Telecom Corporation - Netco)
- 1994: Hargeisa
- 1997: Galcaio (STG Galcom)
- 1998: Mogadishu - (STG NationLink)
- 1999: Burao - (STG Burao)
- 2000: Garowe - (STG Puntel)

Somali Telecom Group has continued to expand and as of 2007, service is available in the following localities:

- Ba'adweyn
- Berbera
- Bosaso Netco
- Burao
- Burtinle
- Erigabo
- Galciao Galcom
- Garowe Puntel
- Goldogob Goltel
- Hargeisa STC Hargeisa

== Operations ==
STG's services include:

- Telephony
- Fax
- Mobile phone
- Phone card
- Local and international long distance
- High Speed internet

== See also ==
- Somtel
- Golis Telecom Somalia
- Hormuud Telecom
- Telcom
- Netco (Somalia)
- NationLink Telecom
- Somafone
