= Netco (Somalia) =

Netco Ltd.
- Type: Private
- Industry: Telecommunications
- Founded: 1993
- Headquarters: Bosaso, Puntland
- Products: Mobile services Fixed line Internet services

North Eastern Telecommunications Company (Netco Ltd.) is a telecommunications company established in 1993 in Bosaso, the commercial capital of Puntland a federal regional state of Somalia.

== Overview ==
Netco is owned by Ismael Haji Abdi, an MBA graduate from Wisconsin University, USA, and is part of the Somali Telecom Group of companies. It is the largest telecommunications firm in the autonomous Puntland region of Somalia.

Netco is a rapidly developing company and has grown massively in the past 15 years, with a current customer-base of over 800,000 individuals.

== Services ==
The company supplies home phones, mobile phone networks and internet services. One of Netco's next targets is to supply electricity throughout Puntland, a project which will take place within the next five years.

== See also ==
- Somtel
- Golis Telecom Somalia
- Hormuud Telecom
- Telcom
- Somali Telecom Group
- NationLink Telecom
- Somafone
