= NationLink Telecom =

Telecommunications firm based in Somalia

- Company type: Privately held company
- Industry: Telecommunications
- Founded: 1997
- Headquarters: Somalia
- Products: Mobile services Internet services Fixed line

NationLink Telecom is a telecommunications firm based in Somalia.

== Overview ==
NationLink Telecom was founded in September 1997 by Abdirizak Ido, a Somali businessman currently serving as the company's President and controlling shareholder. The firm is one of the leading telecommunications service providers (TSP) in Somalia and offers its services throughout the country.

The company's focus is in the core areas of Mobile, Fixed Lines, Internet and Satellite Mobile services. The overall objective of NationLink Telecom is to provide telecommunication services to all Somalis and by doing so, change their lives positively.

We believe that access to communication is the right of every Somali. Therefore, we are committed to providing products and services that will ensure that no matter who you are and where you are in Somalia, you will have such access.

== Services ==
The company's focus is in the core areas of mobile-phone, internet and fixed-line services. Its overall objective is to supply telecommunication services to all Somalis, and in the process, help improve standards of living. Nationlink is among the biggest mobile network operators in the country.

== See also ==
- Golis Telecom Somalia
- Hormuud Telecom
- Telcom
- Somali Telecom Group
- Netco (Somalia)
- Somafone
- Somtel
- Telesom
