= Vereen =

Vereen is both a surname and given name. Notable people with the name include:

- Vereen Bell (1911–1944), American novelist and naval officer
- Ben Vereen (born 1946), American actor, dancer, and singer
- Brock Vereen (born 1992), American football safety
- Carl Vereen (born 1936), American football offensive tackle
- Corey Vereen (born 1995), American football player
- Shane Vereen (born 1989), American football running back
- Wendy Vereen (born 1966), American track and field sprinter

== See also ==
- Verene, given name and surname
