= Salaam Somali Bank =

Bank in Somalia

- Trade name: Salaam Bank
- Type: Commercial bank
- Traded as: Islamic banking services provider
- Industry: Banking, finance
- Founded: 2009
- Headquarters: Mogadishu, Somalia
- Products: Financial services
- Services: Retail Financial Services; Mobile banking Card Services; Islamic Banking
- Website: www.salaambank.so

Salaam Somali Bank, often abbreviated to SSB, is a Somali commercial bank. It is headquartered in Mogadishu, Somalia. SSB is one of the largest privately owned banks in the country.

It was founded in 2009 and was the first Somali bank to introduce new banking services to the country, such as SWIFT.

== History ==
Salaam Somali Bank was established in October 2009. It was the first bank to operate in Somalia since 1991, and was founded to provide trusted banking services to Somali businesses and communities, as well as reconstruct the country's banking system to facilitate economic development and growth.

Salaam Somali Bank herein SSB, is a fully fledged Islamic bank which targets both consumers and businesses. The bank offers personal banking, commercial banking, and non-profit banking. Additionally, the bank offers online banking, which was first introduced in the country in 2010 via its DEEQTOON service. The digital platform was created using Hormuud Telecom's technology to allow for mobile banking to be available for the first time in Somali history. Mobile deposits, withdrawals, bank transfers and balance checks all became available services in the country. Its DEEQTOON service received an update a year later in 2011, which allowed for accounts to transfer money and make digital purchases. SWIFT was introduced shortly afterwards, which allowed for quick and secure international transfers. It also offers mobile banking and debit cards. Hormuud Salaam Foundation was launched in 2009, the only bank at the time in Somalia to have an independent charitable arm.

Salaam Somali Bank launched its monthly micro-finance programme in 2011. The programme is completely free, and by 2021 the program supported 6,306 whereby 59% men and 41% women with $7.5 million. It has been rolled out across Salaam Somali Bank's premises across the country in peri-rural and urban areas.

In 2014, the institution also began providing automatic teller machine (ATM) services in Mogadishu. At their launch the devices were billed as the first of their kind in Somalia.

The Somali banking sector has experienced exponential growth in the last decade, which has led to 15 licensed commercial banks in the country, including SSB. Collectively they have US$1,462.5 million in total assets.

Salaam Somali Bank's financing arm has been active in rebuilding Somalia through strategic infrastructure investments. It was the sole financier of Daaru Salaam City, a green, luxury neighbourhood in Mogadishu. The project consists of 2000 homes, with the capacity of housing 12,000 people. The city boasts a complete set of amenities: ease of accessibility, a local market, health centres and schools.

In 2023, SSB launched a livestock insurance initiative to support pastoralists through the drought. Working in partnership with The World Bank and ZEP-RE, the insurance is part of a wider programme to decrease pastoralists’ reliance on aid and improve access to financial services. This includes promoting savings accounts and a 90% subsidised livestock insurance, which will assist pastoralists with forage when there is no grass to graze.

By March 2026, the programme had enrolled more than 163,000 pastoralists and paid out $4.5 million. The insurance uses satellite data to trigger payouts when drought conditions are detected, allowing pastoralist households to receive payouts before losses worsen.

In 2024, Salaam Somali Bank won The Banker's Islamic Bank of the Year - International Award. The Banker described Salaam Somali Bank as the first African bank to receive the award in the international category, citing its service, innovation, digital development and support for Somalia's drought-affected communities. That year, it also received the Inspiring Bank in Financial Inclusion Excellence award at the Africa Bank 4.0 Awards.

== Leadership and Governance ==
Salaam Somali Bank is listed by the Central Bank of Somalia as a licensed bank and operates under Central Bank regulations. It is also a member of the SOmali Bankers Assocation.

The bank is governed by a board of directors and Executive Management. The bank adopted the ISO Certified 9001:2015 in 2022, and Somali Central Bank standard in 2009.

== Operations ==
Salaam Somali Bank opened its first branch in Hamarweyne and Bakaaro and later opened other branches in Mogadishu. It has 55 branches across the country of Somalia, with 20 branches in the country's capital. SSB offers fully Shariah compliant trade and investment finance, from a micro to corporate level. Its trade finance focuses on fixed income investments, commodities, and equities.

Salaam Somali Bank provides financial services to small, medium-sized and large businesses, as well as NGOs. It has more from sole proprietors through to incorporated companies.

=== Services ===
Salaam Somali Bank's personal banking services include current accounts (personal and business), as well as savings accounts (Dalmar savings accounts for the diaspora, Hajj-Umra account, and students savings account).

A payroll system allows for electronic payments service for employees, vendors and any Somali financial institution, that allows users to make daily/weekly/ monthly payments, with enhanced security. Customers can move funds in U.S. dollars; manage payments; and get remittance notifications by SMS and email to recipients. Its Islamic Financing products facilitates Mudharabah, Murabahah and Musharakah.

The institution's commercial banking services include business current accounts, Bank Guarantees and Letters of Credit.

The bank also offers trade finance, which is the largest of the bank's wholesale revenues and takes place through fixed-income investments, commodities, and equities. The bank utilises SWIFT for its international transfers, allowing for the flow of money in and out of Somalia. Its non-profit banking services include a Trust Account and Project Accounts for non-governmental organizations, associations, societies and trusts.

The bank also launched a microfinance product (Kalkaal) for small businesses and professionals. Additionally, it offers anti-money laundering protection.

SSB offers a range of Islamic financing options to personal and business customers. This is including equity-based finance services, Musharakah and Mudarabah, asset-based finance services, Murabaha and Istisna, as well as Ijaarah (leasing) and Qardul Hassan (free loan-based finance).

The Bank provides mobile banking through DEEQTOON and the Salaam App. The app also allows customers to open accounts, check balances, transfer money, make payments, access statements, manage cards and use exchanges services. For business customers, the bank's digital platforms support supplier payments, payroll processing and transaction monitoring. In 2023, DEEQTOON's transaction volumes hit record levels with 400,000 transactions being made every day, both in urban centers and rural communities.

SSB also provides digital payment services for small and medium-sized enterprises, including electronic payment collection and settlement services. The bank has provided financial literacy and digital banking training to more than 2,000 customers, including entrepreneurs, women-led enterprise and rural communities.

In Jul 2024, the bank partnered with Visa to introduce Visa Debit cards across its branches and online platforms.

That month, Salaam Somali Bank also partnered with Mastercard to launch the Waafi Card, a digital-first multi-currency prepaid card for international travellers and diaspora communities. The card allows customers to make payments at point-of-sale terminals, ATMs, and online platforms, both domestically and internationally.

== Hormuud Salam Foundation ==
Hormuud Salam Foundation (HSF) is a non-profit foundation that is fully funded by Hormuud Telecom and Salaam Somali Bank, created to improve the everyday lives of Somalis. Its services span education, healthcare, technical and employment skills training.

Throughout the COVID-19 pandemic, SSB made numerous donations to the Somali healthcare system to help treat and slow the spread of the virus. Severe shortages in Somalia of oxygen during the COVID-19 pandemic led to SSB partly funding the country's first public oxygen plant. In 2021, HSF supported the effort to help raise $4 million for the Somalia Action Network COVID-19 relief fund, in partnership with the Somali Chamber of Commerce.

HSF has also supported overseas medical treatment for Somali children with serious health conditions. In August 2025, the foundation sent two Somali children with congenital heart defects to Milan for specialist treatment not available in Somalia.

HSF funds a range of philanthropic relief and development projects, and directly responds to humanitarian crises across Somalia. Since 2022, it has provided regular cash-aid to alleviate the impact of the drought on communities. In May 2023, it was one of the first to respond to the catastrophic floods that displaced a quarter of a million Somalis. The NGO also offers social development services and provides training programmes to Somali communities. Programmes are aimed at increasing individuals’ ability to access employment opportunities and education.

In November 2024, HSF partnered with Somalia's Ministry of Planning, Investment and Economic Development on an initiative to support the resettlement of 10,000 internally displaced families. The programme included land for resettlement in Jazeera, south of Mogadishu, as well as vocational training and employment support.

In November 2025, the United Nations Development Programme and HSF launched an 18-month initiative to support youth employment and enterprise development in Somalia's green and blue economy. The programme is supported by Hormuud Telecom and Salaam Somali Bank, with SSB's role described by UNDP as facilitating access to Islamic finance for young entrepreneurs.

In July 2025, HSF received the Africa Social Impact Leadership Award at the 15th African Business Leadership Awards, held during the ALM Africa Summit in London.

== Regulations ==
The bank has been some of the first to adopt international regulatory standards in Somalia. Including the ISO Certified 9001:2015 in 2022 and Somali Central Bank standard in 2009.
