= Somafone =

- Company type: Private
- Industry: Telecommunications
- Founded: 2003
- Headquarters: Mogadishu, Somalia
- Products: Mobile services
- Website: www.somafone.com

Somafone Telecommunications Service Company (operating as Somafone) is one of Somalia's leading telecommunications firms. It was established in 2003 as a fully owned subsidiary of Somafone FZ LLC of the Dubai Internet City. The company's head offices are located in Mogadishu.

== Mission and Services ==
Somafone's primary objective is to remain the leading mobile network operator in Somalia. The company prioritizes high-quality service delivery to its customers by implementing international best practices and adapting them to the unique conditions of the Somali market. This approach ensures superior service quality for all subscribers.

The company provides a range of mobile services, including voice and data plans, and maintains a fast-growing subscriber base. With over 150 employees, Somafone supports the telecommunications industry's rapid growth in Somalia. Additionally, it has developed a countrywide dealer network to manage the distribution and sale of its products and services.

== Strategic Partnerships ==
Somafone has established strategic business associations with global leaders in mobile telephony. These partnerships enable the company to stay aligned with global telecommunications trends while addressing the challenges of the evolving mobile communication landscape. This strategic alignment helps Somafone maintain its market position and deliver value to its customers.

== Employees and Operations ==
To meet the demands of a growing customer base, Somafone has expanded its workforce and developed an extensive dealer network to handle the distribution and sales of its products and services nationwide.

== See also ==
- Golis Telecom Somalia
- Hormuud Telecom
- Telcom
- Netco (Somalia)
- NationLink Telecom
- Somali Telecom Group
