= Verene =

Verene is a given name and surname. Notable people with the surname include:

- Verene Shepherd (born 1960), Jamaican historian
- Chris Verene (born 1969), American photographer, performance artist, and musician
- Donald Phillip Verene (born 1937), American philosopher and writer

== See also ==
- Vereen, given name and surname
