= Africell =

African telecommunications company

Africell Group
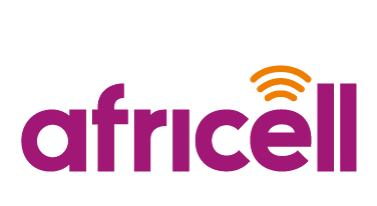
- Type: Private limited company
- Industry: Telecommunications
- Founded: 2001
- Headquarters: London, UK
- Area served: The Gambia; Sierra Leone; Democratic Republic of the Congo; Angola
- Key people: Ziad Dalloul Group Chairman and CEO
- Products: Mobile telephony Internet services Mobile money
- Website: www.africell.com

Africell Group is a mobile technology company providing voice, messaging, data, mobile money and other integrated telecoms services to almost 20 million subscribers across Africa. It is the only mainstream US-owned mobile network operator in Africa.

== Company overview ==
Africell was founded in 2001. It has US ownership and is headquartered in London, United Kingdom. The company has approximately 10,000 direct and outsourced employees and currently operates in four countries – The Gambia, Sierra Leone, Democratic Republic of Congo and Angola.

Africell is a market leader in The Gambia and Sierra Leone, with approximately 60% market share of the telecoms sectors in each. In Democratic Republic of Congo, Africell has between 20 and 25% market share in the provinces in which it is active. There has been significant subscriber growth in all markets since 2010. As of January 2026, Africell has more than 16 million subscribers. Its Africell Impact Foundation, which was launched in July 2022, has collaborated with institutions and organisations including Sotheby's, the London School of Economics, the United Nations Development Program, The HALO Trust, NBA Africa, the Guggenheim Museum and the Royal Botanic Gardens, Kew.

Africell is among the fastest-growing mobile telecommunications companies in Africa. The group is undergoing rapid expansion due to strong demographic trends in Africa (in terms of age, education, urbanisation and other factors), deepening telecoms penetration in most African countries, and the increasing availability of affordable smartphones. In addition to investing in mobile network operations and telecommunications infrastructure, Africell's strategy involves developing fintech products and services such as micro-payments, micro-insurance and micro-finance which - in addition to helping individual customers - have a multiplier effect on wider economic growth in Africa. In February 2026, Africell announced an agreement with Binance to explore crypto education and digital asset services in Africa.

In January 2021, Africell won a competitive international tender process for a telecommunications license in Angola. Africell launched services in Angola in April 2022, the first new or independent operator in two decades to do so.

== History ==
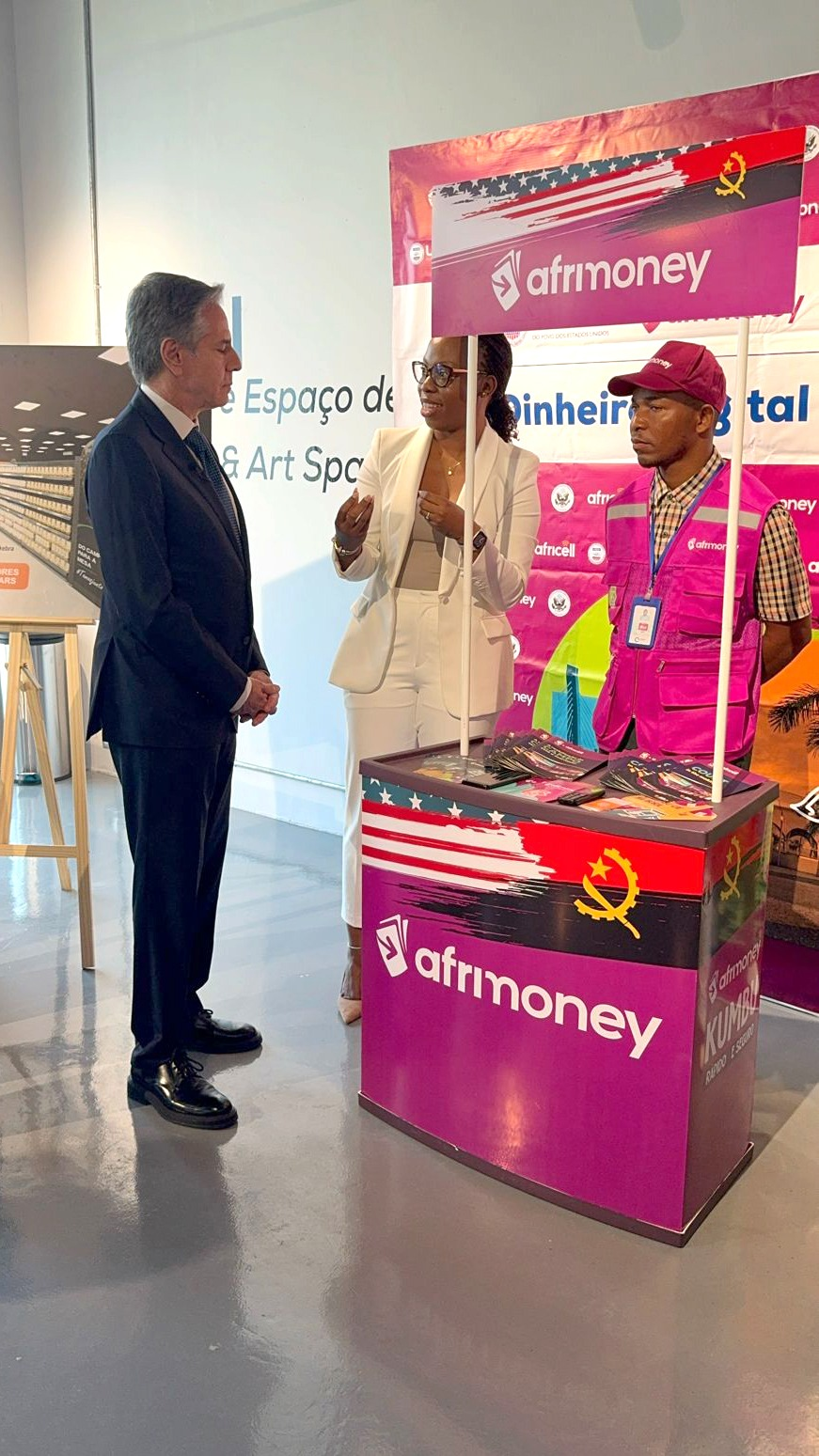
United States Secretary of State Antony Blinken during a visit to Africell Angola in January 2024.

Africell was founded in 2001 by US entrepreneur Ziad Dalloul. Africell launched its first commercial operations in The Gambia in 2001, before entering Sierra Leone in 2005 and building up a solid market leadership position in both West African countries. Subsequently, Africell Group expanded south and east, into Democratic Republic of Congo (2012) and Uganda (2014). Africell's strategy is to move into markets in which it can "make a positive difference" in terms of reducing prices, covering more territory, and improving internet speed and reliability. Africell ended services in Uganda in October 2021.

In 2018, it was announced that Africell group had secured a $100m loan facility from the US Government's International Development Finance Corporation (DFC). DFC's substantial investment in Africell followed a strict due diligence process and reflected a policy goal of the US government to significantly increase its commercial investments in Africa. In May 2022, Secretary of State Antony Blinken highlighted Africell as an example of US investment in sub-Saharan Africa making "real impact" and advancing "security and transparency" in the region. In a statement made by The White House during the 49th G7 Summit in Hiroshima, Japan, Africell was listed as a key vehicle of the Partnership for Global Infrastructure and Investment in the 'Lobito Corridor' region of Africa. Antony Blinken visited Africell's head office in Luanda in January 2024 and Africell's CEO, Ziad Dalloul, met President Joe Biden - along with the leaders of Angola, Democratic Republic of Congo, Tanzania and Zambia - in Lobito, Angola, in December 2024. In October 2024, Africell issued a $300 million debut public corporate bond, putting them among an elite cohort of African firms to have raised finance through public markets.

Africell launched the Africell Impact Foundation in June 2022. It produced the DRC Pavilion at the 2023 London Design Biennale and has undertaken collaborations with organisations including the London School of Economics, Sotheby's and NBA Africa. Africell's podcast series about Sierra Leone, Salone Stories, which was co-produced with Sierra Leonean playwright and historian Charlie Haffner, included interviews with Dame Judi Dench, Aminatta Forna and David Sengeh. Africell's first feature length documentary, Lobito Bound, follows British explorer Dwayne Fields on an expedition across Africa's 'Lobito Corridor', and was released worldwide on Prime Video and Apple TV in December 2025.

== Operations ==
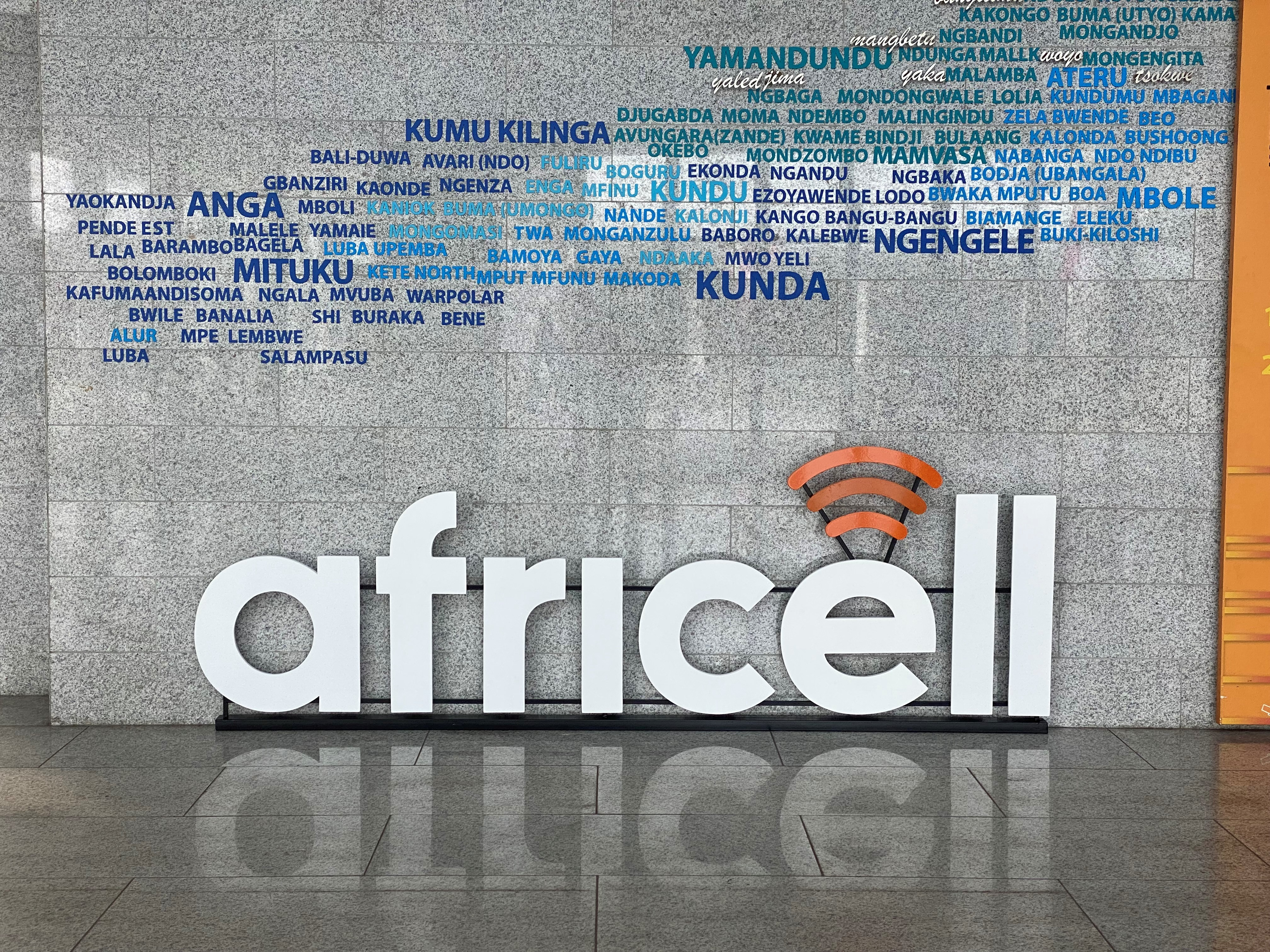

Africell is the predominant mobile network provider in The Gambia and Sierra Leone and growing rapidly in Democratic Republic of Congo and Angola, both of which are considered high potential markets for the African telecoms sector. Africell's activity is directed from its group headquarters in London.

Africell Group footprint
Country	Launch date	Market share
Angola	2022	24%
Gambia	2001	60%
Sierra Leone	2005	60%
Democratic Republic of the Congo	2012	20-25%

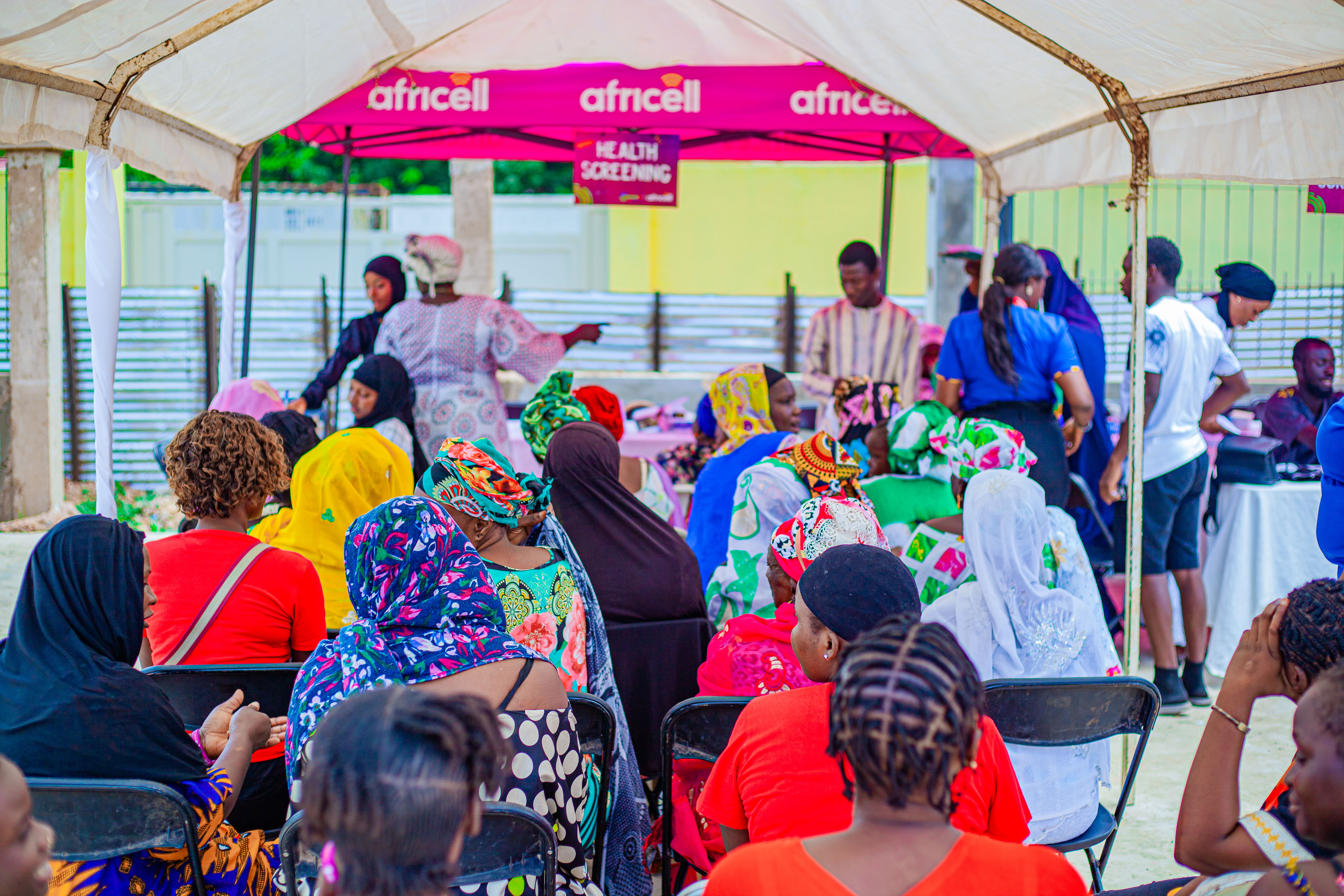
An Africell community healthcare initiative in Banjul, The Gambia, July 2022

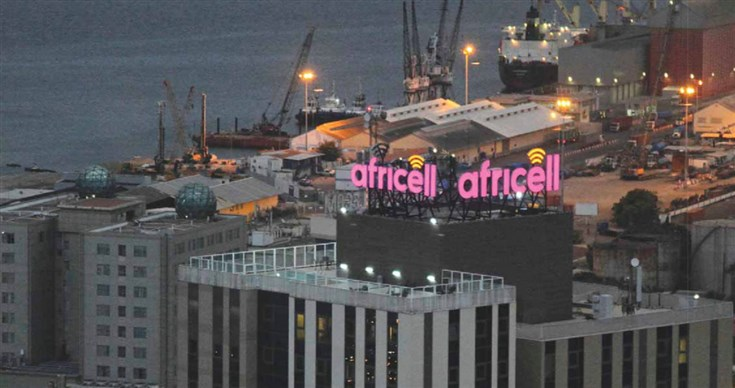
Africell's headquarters in Luanda, Angola's capital and largest urban centre.

=== The Gambia ===
Africell launched operations in Gambia in 2001. Africell has been the market leader in the country since 2006 in terms of the number of subscribers, and it boasts 93% territorial coverage. Africell offers 2G, 3G and 4G services in Gambia and the country is the Africell operating market with the highest percentage penetration of data services. Africell is well-respected in Gambia, both as a mobile network provider and as a significant private sector employer, and the company known to have the widest coverage and the highest quality network structure with services available to almost 100% of the Gambian population.

=== Sierra Leone ===
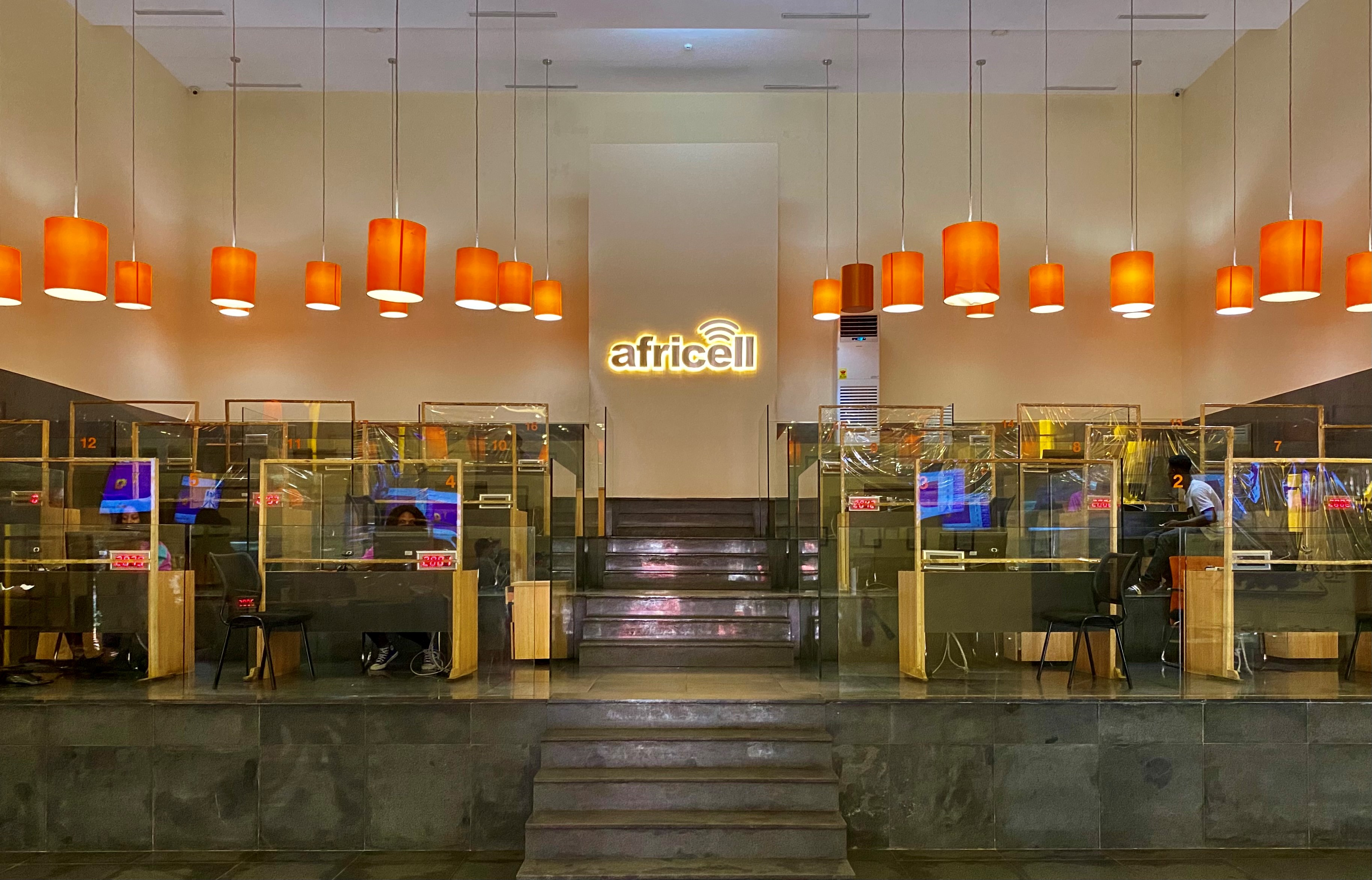
Africell's flagship customer care centre in an historic old cinema building in Freetown, Sierra Leone

Africell launched commercial operations in Sierra Leone in 2005. The company extended its footprint further in 2009 through the acquisition of Tigo Sierra Leone. Today, Africell's network covers more than 92% of the population. Africell has been the market leader in Sierra Leone since 2009, with approximately 4.2 million active subscribers and an extensive portfolio of 3G and 4G services. Africell's growth in Sierra Leone is driven by increasing data revenues, robust commercial promotions with data products accounting for a steadily increasing share of customer recharges over time.

During the Ebola epidemic which struck Sierra Leone and other West African states between 2014 and 2016, Africell played a prominent role as a local private sector partner to the government and international agencies battling the virus on the ground, deploying its hardware, telecommunications services, media platforms and distribution network to support the anti-Ebola campaign. Africell has earned a reputation in the nation as the premier company in terms of meeting its corporate social responsibilities.

=== Democratic Republic of Congo ===
Africell launched services in Democratic Republic of Congo in 2012, since which date the company has acquired over 5 million active subscribers. Africell currently offers 2G, 3G and 4G coverage primarily in the metropolitan and population-dense provinces of Kinshasa, Kongo Central and Haut-Katanga.

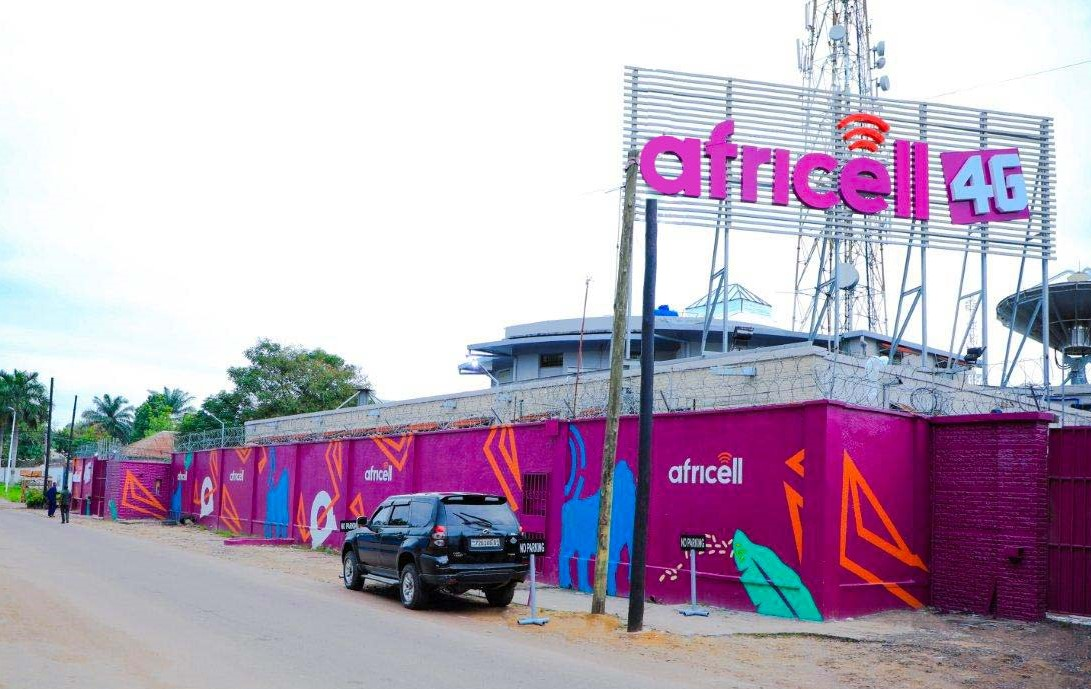
An Africell facility in Democratic Republic of the Congo

=== Uganda ===
Africell entered Uganda by acquiring Orange Uganda in November 2014. Following the transaction, Africell doubled its number of active subscribers and eventually served c. 1.1 million active subscribers 3G and 4G services. Africell ended services in Uganda in October 2021 after announcing a strategic reorientation of the Group towards more impactful and higher-growth market opportunities in west and central Africa.

=== Angola ===
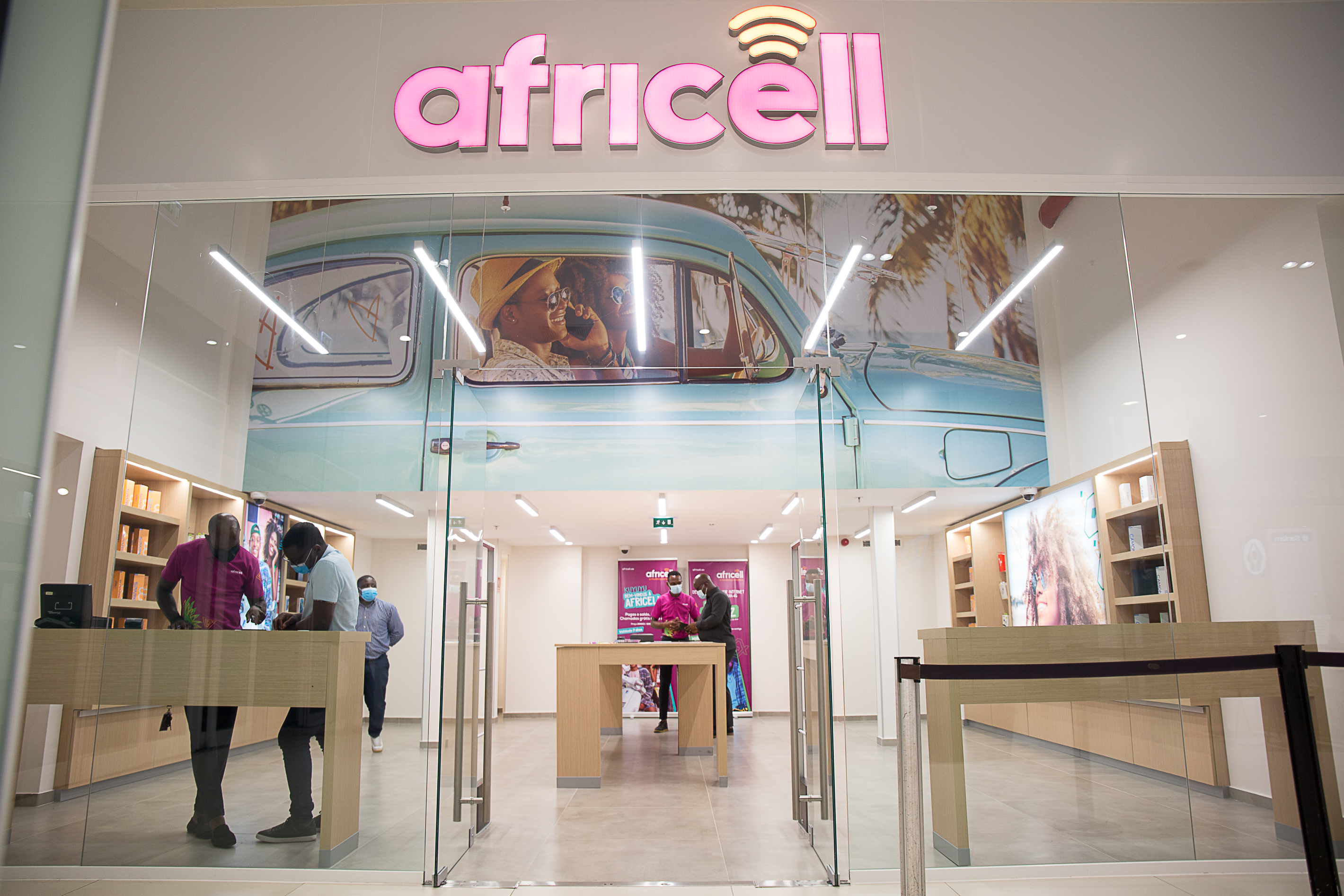
An Africell store in Angola

In January 2021, following a competitive international public tender process for a Unified Communications Service License in Angola, Africell was named by the Angolan government as the winning bidder. At the time of the award, Africell stated an intention to start commercial operations in the country in 2022, which it did in April 2022. The entry of Africell Group (an experienced private international operator) into the telecoms sector in Angola will have a positive impact on the market as a result of more competition, better pricing, and improved network quality. In July 2021 Africell announced a major partnership with Nokia, under the terms of which the Finnish company is its main supplier of network equipment in Angola. Africell is projected to create several thousand local jobs within five years and help liberalise an economy which (some have argued) has historically been inhospitable to overseas investment.

In May 2022 U.S. Deputy Secretary of State Wendy R. Sherman visited Africell's office in Luanda, Angola, during a diplomatic tour of southern Africa, describing Africell's activities in Angola as "phenomenal" and commending the company for providing digital skills and jobs to young Angolans. Africell's 5G network - the first in Angola - was activated in July 2022. Africell launched services in Angola's Benguela Province in December 2022, in Huíla Province in August 2023 and in Huambo Province in July 2025.

== Social impact ==
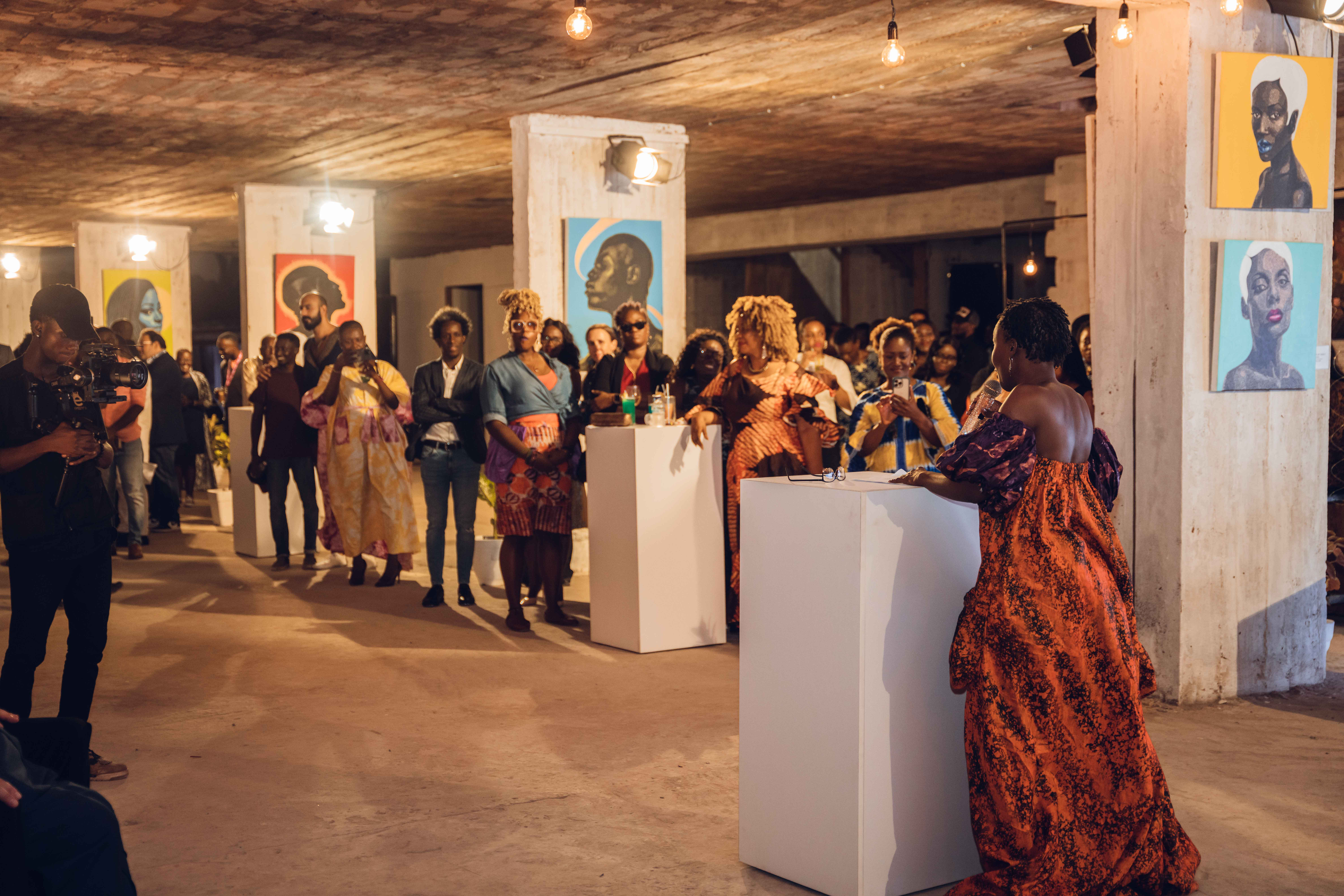
An Africell Impact Foundation event in Sierra Leone, May 2022

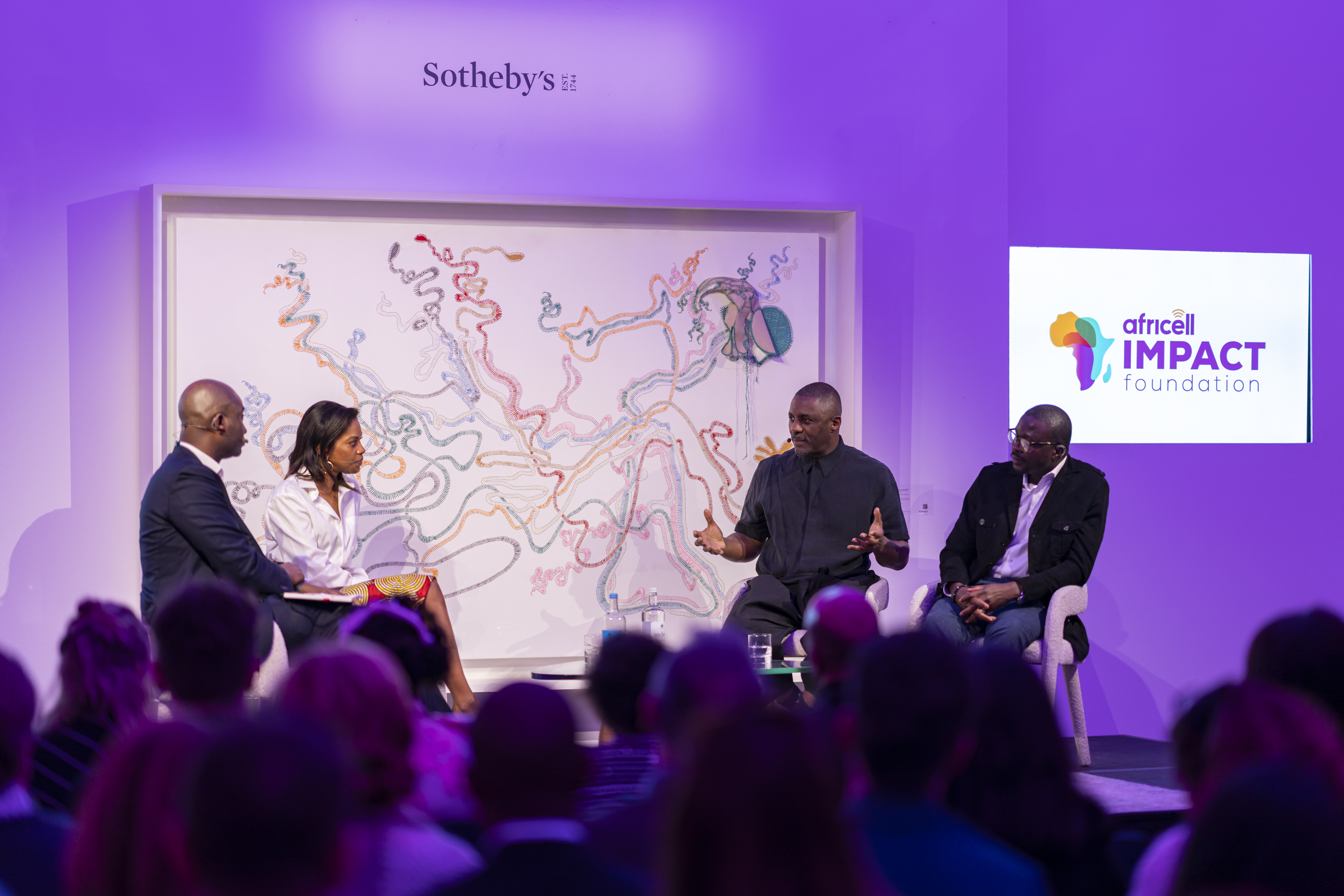
A panel event co-hosted by Africell Impact Foundation and Sotheby's in London in March 2024, at which Idris Elba and others discussed the future of Africa's creative industries

Africell launched the Africell Impact Foundation in May 2022. With focus areas including arts and culture, education and entrepreneurship, and health and wellbeing, it aims to leverage Africell's status and resources as a major technology brand within its operating markets in order to create opportunities and capacity in relevant areas. In addition to hundreds of independent initiatives, Africell has partnered for social impact work with organisations including the London School of Economics, Sotheby's and NBA Africa.
