= Virgin Mobile Saudi Arabia =

Virgin Mobile KSA
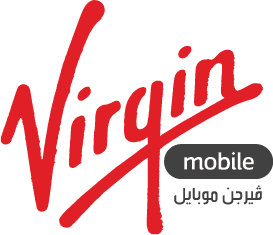
- Industry: Mobile Network Operator
- Founded: April 1, 2014; 12 years ago in Riyadh, Saudi Arabia
- Headquarters: Riyadh, Saudi Arabia
- Key people: Yaarob Al-Sayegh, CEO
- Products: Prepaid plans, Postpaid plans, Prepaid mobile broadband services
- Website: virginmobile.sa

Virgin Mobile KSA is a telecommunication company operating in the Kingdom of Saudi Arabia.

The company behind Virgin Mobile Saudi Arabia was formally called the Virgin Mobile Saudi Consortium — a Saudi Arabian company that brings together local, regional and global shareholders and experts in mobile telecommunications.

The company is headquartered in Riyadh and has outlets across the kingdom and a member care centre in Jeddah.

== History ==
Virgin Mobile Saudi Arabia was awarded a license by the Communications and Information Technology Commission to operate as a Mobile Virtual Network Operator in April 2014.

Virgin Mobile Saudi Consortium LLC was formally incorporated in June 2013, shortly after the award of Virgin Mobile’s license by CITC.

The company is part of Virgin Mobile Middle East & Africa and has local Saudi Arabian companies as shareholders.

== Network ==
Virgin Mobile KSA uses the STC (Saudi Telecom Company) network for all its Saudi based services. This network operates on the following frequencies:

- 3G 2100 MHz
- 4G LTE 1800/2300 MHz
- 5G

== Products ==
Virgin Mobile Saudi Arabia says it focuses mainly on “fairness and simplicity” in its offerings.
