= Gambia Telecommunications Company =

State-owned telecommunications company

The Gambia Telecommunications Company Ltd., also known by Gamtel for short, is the principal telecommunications company of the Gambia. It is a state company, charged with the task of overseeing the provision of telecommunications and internet service in the country. In association with Gamtel's internet company, Gamnet, it has successfully built Gambia's internet infrastructure. The company was established in 1984 by an act of parliament as the single licensed telecommunications services provider in the country, with its stock 99% owned by the government of the Gambia, and the remaining 1% owned by the Gambia Port Authority. In 1993 it commenced the task of creating the Gambia Radio & Television Service, a company that operates the nation's radio and television industry. Gamtel currently employs over 1,000 people and its main offices are at Gamtel House in Banjul.

In 2007 Gamtel was partially privatised with 50% of its equity sold to Spectrum Group, a telecommunications company of Lebanon, due to financial problems at Gamtel. The merger came to an end after only one year, when Gamtel declined to renew the Spectrum management contract. According to a publication on the standard newspaper dated 6th April 2018, there was a lot of fraud in the GAMTEL gateway contract.In 2006, global vice group was contracted to manage the gateway but was later terminated, followed by Spectrum and then system 1,TELL and finally MGI which was managing the gateway until 2007. Circumstances surrounding the termination of the contract with Spectrum still remains unclear.

In 2000, Gamtel established a subsidiary named Gamcel as a national GSM operator. However, this cellular has not been able to provide tough competition to other telecommunication giants within the country.
