= Golis Telecom Somalia =

Telecommunication company in Somalia

Golis Telecom
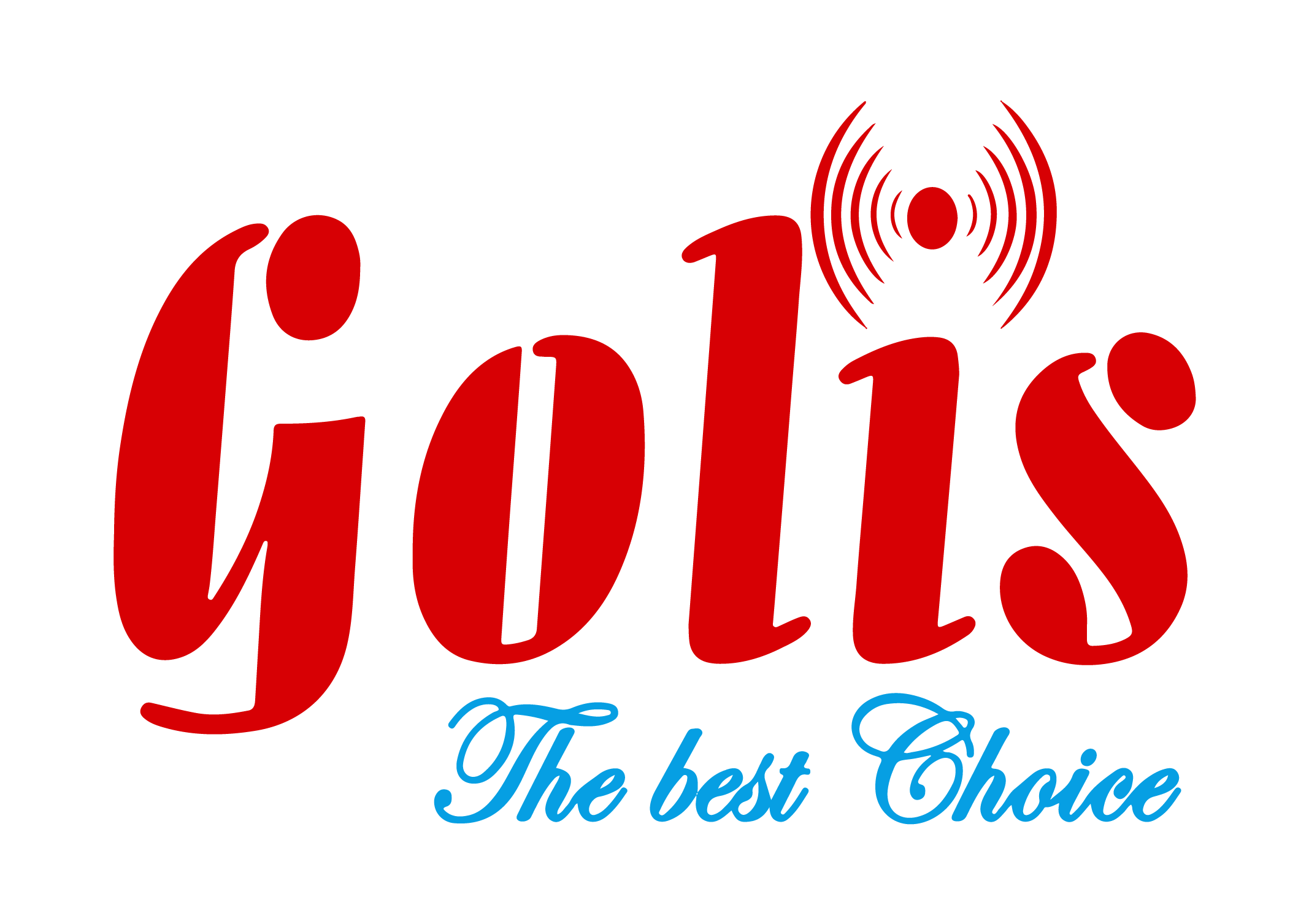
- Company type: Private
- Industry: Telecommunications
- Founded: 2002
- Headquarters: Bosaso, Puntland, Somalia
- Key people: Mohamed Ahmed Bari (COO); Abdiaziz Guureeye Karshe (Chairman)
- Products: Mobile services Internet services Fixed line
- Website: www.golistelecom.com

Golis Telecom (Somali: Shirkadda Isgaarsiinta ee Golis), shortened to Golis, is the largest telecommunications operator in the Puntland state of northeastern Somalia. It was founded in 2002 with the objective of supplying the country with GSM mobile services, fixed line and internet services. The firm has an extensive network that covers all the major cities and more than 50 districts in Puntland.

== Overview ==
The company has its headquarters in the port city and the commercial capital of Puntland, Bosaso. Golis Telecom has also centers in the main cities and towns such as Garowe, Qardho, Galkaio, Las'anod, Erigavo, Armo, Galdogob, Burtinle, Bursalah, Badhan, Dhahar, Bargal, Hingalol Bo’ame, as wellErigavo in Somaliland.

Golis Mobile offers other services such as XOGMAAL. XOGMAAL enables enquiring, emailing through the mobile, and searching the online encyclopedias and dictionaries as well as search engines such as Google. It also allows online checking of stocks, currency rate exchange and weather forecasts. Additionally, the service offers access to local Somali media, as well as international news channels like the BBC, Al-Jazeera and CNN. According to The Economist, in 2005, Somali offered some of the cheapest mobile calling rates in Africa.

In August 2011, the Salaam Bank also launched an independent (Kaaftoon) service partnering the institution with Golis Telecom Somalia.

In 2022, Golis joined an interconnection framework led by Somalia's National Communications Authority (NCA), designed to enable seamless calls between customers on different networks. This initiative was part of efforts to improve competition and enhance service accessibility for consumers.

In 2023, Golis was certified as a licensed mobile money provider through its platform SAHAL, which plays a key role in supporting the digital economy of Puntland. SAHAL is among the most widely used mobile money services in the region, as Somalia overall has one of the highest mobile-money adoption rates in the world, with approximately 87% of the population using mobile money services as of 2021.

According to a 2025 BuddeComm report, Golis has plans to expand 5G services in the near future, similar to other Somali telecom operators such as Hormuud and Somtel.

Despite having an extensive network, a 2025 Tracxn report noted that Golis has yet to secure external funding, which presents a challenge for scaling up its advanced technologies and expanding its infrastructure further.

== See also ==
- Hormuud Telecom
- Telesom company
- Somali Telecom Group
- Netco (Somalia)
- Somafone
