= Hormuud Telecom =

Somali telecommunications company

Hormuud Telecom Somalia
- Type: Private
- Industry: Telecommunications
- Predecessor: Al-Barakat
- Founded: 2 April 2002
- Headquarters: Mogadishu, Somalia
- Key people: Ahmed Mohamed Yusuf (Chairman & CEO)
- Products: GSM fixed line mobile banking WAAFI App
- Brands: EVC Plus; ADSL Plus
- Number of employees: 20,000+ (2021)
- Website: www.hormuud.com

Hormuud Telecom Somalia Inc. is a privately held telecommunications company based in Mogadishu, Somalia. It is the largest telecommunication company and largest private-sector employer in the country, and also Somalia's first private enterprise to be internationally ISO certified.

The company operates numerous services, including its mobile money transfer service.

The corporation is one of the only in Somalia to have a charitable arm, the Hormuud Salaam Foundation, which was launched in 2009. During the COVID-19 pandemic in the country, Hormuud made numerous donations to the Somali healthcare system.

Hormuud launched 5G in Somalia in 2024.

== History ==
Hormuud was established in 2002 in Mogadishu, Somalia by a small group of shareholders, and originally consisted of 16 telecommunication sites.

Ahmed Mohamed Yusuf, Hormuud Telecom's CEO joined Hormuud Telecom in 2002 with the intention to rebuild Somalia by connecting people with life-changing connectivity services. In the same year as its launch, Hormuud launched its fixed phone line service and GSM, a second-generation digital mobile network, which became widely used in Europe and other parts of the world.

In 2011, the company conducted a mobile money transfer through EVC Plus, the first of its kind in Somalia. EVC Plus functions as a digital wallet, allowing users to purchase goods and services and transfer money. Automated payments and SMS reminders were also added as features. Financial reports on EVC Plus can also be viewed without an internet connection. In December 2012, Hormuud launched its Tri-Band 3G service for mobile and internet clients. Also the first of its kind in the country, this 3G mobile telecommunications technology offers users a faster and more secure connection.

In July 2014, Hormuud Telecom, along with NationLink and Somtel, signed an interconnection agreement. The cooperative deal established the Somali Telecommunication Company (STC), which allowed their mobile clients to communicate across all three networks. Later that year, Hormuud trialed the first 4G services in Somalia. They began expanding their 4G network capacity in 2015 in partnership with the Somalian Ministry of Telecommunications.

In 2009, Hormuud Telecom established the Hormuud Salaam Foundation, becoming the first corporate foundation in Somalia. In 2019, the company offered commission-free bulk cash transfers to NGOs responding to floods around Beledweyne, Baidoa, Jowhar, and the Gedo region of southern Somalia. This allowed the Somali Cash Consortium and other NGOs to provide direct donations to vulnerable Somalis in need.

In 2020, the company became the first private corporation in Somalia to be ISO certified. This international standard accredited Hormuud's products and services as satisfying the needs of their customers through an effective quality management system and meeting all the relevant regulatory requirements.

In 2021, Hormuud announced plans to guarantee nationwide 4G coverage by 2023 in Somalia. It calculated that 30% of its 3.6 million customers still rely on 2G networks, the majority of whom reside in rural areas. The expansion will provide rural communities access to fast internet services, which is essential for both nationwide and rural economic development. Access to 4G is a major goal of Hormuud, in line with the United Nations' Sustainable Development Goals (SDGs). In February 2021, the Central Bank of Somalia issued the first mobile money licence to Hormuud Telecom, assuring that its mobile money platform EVC Plus is now formally regulated and licensed by the Central Bank. The move formalised digital payments as a payment method within the country and will enable further integration of the Somali financial system with the international financial system.

Hormuud also launched Somalia's first indigenous mobile money app early in the same year. WAAFI combines mobile money, communication, entertainment, and payments, wherein consumers can access bank accounts, perform online transactions, send international remittances, and make international/domestic phone calls all through the app. WAAFI's integrated mobile money experience is an upgrade from the existing USSD technology that many Somalis use.

In 2023, Hormuud Telecom hosted its Somali Success Stories conference, bringing together government leaders, industry representatives and over fifty businesses to celebrate the businesses and innovations driving Somalia's economic growth, and problem solve for the future.

In 2024, Hormuud Telecom's CEO Ahmed Yusuf was named CXO of the year at the Africa Tech Festival, and CEO of the year at the World Communications Awards.

In 2024, Hormuud Telecom brought 5G to Somalia, rolling out the service at no extra cost to customers in over 30 of Somalia's towns and cities. As a result of the first phase of the rollout 5G coverage in these areas stands at 81%.

In partnership with Salaam Somali Bank, Mastercard, Telesom, Golis and Paymentology, Hormuud Telecom introduced contactless payments in Somalia. Together, they launched a co-branded, tokenised, tap-to-pay digital companion card along with a physical card for Waafi mobile app users. The digital card is said to be a first for the Horn of Africa.

The same year, Hormuud Telecom signed an MoU with the Federal Government of Somalia's Ministry of Environment and Climate Change and Salaam Somali Bank to reinvest climate adaptation and mitigation funding into green initiatives within the country.

== Operations ==
Hormuud Telecom has more than 3.6 million subscribers in Somalia, roughly three million of whom use its mobile money platform EVC Plus. More than 189,000 Somali investors have shares in Hormuud Telecom.

Hormuud employs more than 20,000 full-time and part-time staff with different specialties, including telecommunication engineering, customer service, sales and marketing, and finance specialists. Around 45% of the firm's personnel are engineers. More than 17,999 Somali investors have shares in Hormuud Telecom. It is the largest private employer in the country, with over 800 customer service centres in both urban and rural Somalia.

Hormuud provides a range of services for commercial, consumer, and residential use. They include fixed line services, GSM mobile services, 2G, 3G and 4G services, Hormuud Mifi, Enterprise Internet, and Hormuud Hotspot. Hormud has no transport services. The company may rent bajajs (motorcycles) to drivers who pay a third of their earnings. As of 2021, the company operates predominantly in south and central Somalia and has 600 masts across the country.

As of 2021, it was estimated that over 11.25 million Somalis, or 70% of Somalia's population, have access to 4G internet. Hormuud also provides the cheapest 4G mobile internet in Africa and in the Arab world. Hormuud Telecom has pledged to ensure full 4G coverage across Somalia by 2023.

== Technology and products ==
=== Mobile services ===
In 2002, Hormuud launched GSM Mobile Services, a prepaid service that offers options for contract or pay-as-you-go mobile services. Customers can top-up their accounts using Hormuud recharge vouchers and scratch cards.

In 2016, Hormuud launched its Ilwadaag service, which allows for reverse calling and has become an important service for low-income Somalis. A whitelist was later added so that families and friends can connect more easily using the service.

=== Mobile internet and broadband ===
In 2013, Hormuud launched Hormuud Hotspot, a high-speed, secure, and reliable Wi-Fi broadband internet accessible in public places, hotels, and educational institutions. In 2014, it launched Hormuud Mifi, a portable 4G wireless router that can connect to multiple smartphones, tablets, or laptops and offers 4G internet for on-the-go web surfing. The same year, Hormuud launched ADSL Plus, a service that uses a customer's telephone line to send and receive internet data and make calls. At this time, internet capacity in the country was insufficient, yet subsequent capacity upgrades have allowed Hormuud to deliver high-speed fixed and home broadband services to households in Somalia.

Enterprise Internet, a broadband service that offers wireless internet services, was launched in 2014. It enabled simultaneous broadband connectivity sessions for multiple devices. The service is predominantly aimed at providing fixed broadband services for businesses and aid agencies working in Somalia. During the same year, Hormuud also launched My SMS, a bulk messaging service for communication to a large workforce or group of students.

In 2024, Hormuud Telecom launched 5G services across Somalia, including Mogadishu, Kismayo, Galkayo, Baidoa, Dhusamareeb, Beledwayne, Afgoye, Merca, and Dhobley. 4G customers received upgrades to 5G at no extra cost, with 5G coverage in these areas reaching up to 81%. The 5G service offers speeds up to 400Gbit/s per wavelength, with total capacity options up to 38Tbit/s. Hormuud offers an unlimited data plan at $20 per month, one of the most affordable in Africa. Hormuud's 4G network, now covers 70% of Somalia's population, with a target of 88% urban and 70% rural coverage.

In 2024, Hormuud Telecom signed up to the GSMA’s Humanitarian Connectivity Charter pledging to provide connectivity in times of crisis and enhance collaboration with humanitarian organisations. Hormuud Telecom has played a vital role in disaster response in Somalia by replacing basic ringtones with critical alert messages that provide public safety instructions.

=== EVC Plus ===
First introduced in 2012, EVC Plus is a unique option to transfer and receive mobile money; it operates like SMS. Over 67% of Somalis, especially the most vulnerable communities, use mobile money technology as a sole payment system. EVC Plus differs from many other mobile money platforms in Africa by being totally free at the point of use. The mobile money platform has several key functionalities, such as person-to-person money transfer, person-to-merchant/business money transfer, airtime/data top-up, and account management.

Mobile money is widely used in Somalia, with data from the World Bank showing that mobile money transfer is crucial in Somali's economic and infrastructure growth, with 155 million transactions worth US$2.7 billion reported every month. The majority of these transactions are made through EVC Plus. Research shows that mobile money plays a crucial role in minimising currency loss and fake money.

Non-governmental organisations (NGOs) and welfare organisations sending cash to Somalis in remote areas are exempted from the EVC wallet limit of $300. In the past, Hormuud Telecom provided commission-free bulk cash transfers to NGOs responding to crises (like floods in 2019).

In 2019, Hormuud Telecom launched its humanitarian portal to better facilitate cash aid to remote and difficult to reach areas. The portal uses Hormuud's mobile money network to provide a traceable, timely and efficient way to distribute cash assistance – reducing risks and operating costs for NGOs. The portal can deliver aid to both feature phones and smartphones, and it is used by over 120 humanitarian partners.

The portal won the Africa Tech Festival's Changing Lives award in 2022, for its role in transforming mobile money cash transfers and providing essential financial services to millions of Somalis during the 2021 drought.

In 2023, Hormuud Telecom partnered with the GSMA's GSMA Mobile for Humanitarian Innovation Programme (M4H) to increase the uptake of mobile-money enabled aid disbursement by INGOs. The goal of the partnership is to enable the exchange of best practice, and spur innovation.

In Somalia, 70.2% of mobile money users pay education fees on the platform; 56.4% disburse donations and charity; 28.3% shop online; 18.0% receive cash transfers from NGOs; and 16.7% pay government taxes. Research from SIMAD University in Mogadishu has found that the adoption of mobile money throughout Somalia is responsible for the growth of small and medium-sized enterprises.

In 2024, Hormuud introduced interoperability in partnership with local banks, which enables seamless payments between bank accounts and mobile money wallets for the first time in Somalia. It allows EVC Plus customers to access basic banking functions like deposits and money transfers through the mobile money platform and means customers can make withdrawals without having to visit a physical bank.

=== Nasiye ===
Nasiye was first launched in 2013, and became more prominent during the COVID-19 pandemic. This service allows a user to set up music or reading options as their dial tone. During the pandemic, Hormuud replaced some of the Nasiye dial tones with public health announcements to educate vulnerable populations and communities. Hormuud removed service subscription fees to help support the country from 2019 onwards.

=== WAAFI ===
In 2021, Hormuud launched Somalia's first indigenous mobile money application, which gives Somalis access to a range of digital services across a singular platform for the first time. On the WAAFI app, consumers can access bank accounts, perform online transactions, send international remittances, and make international and domestic phone calls.

WAAFI is a fully integrated mobile money platform, upgrading existing USSD technology that many Somalis use. Currently, USSD-enabled mobile money technology has a penetration rate as high as 80% in urban areas and 55% in rural areas. WAAFI allows users to access their bank account through deposits and withdrawals via their EVC Plus wallet. Through this, businesses can generate QR codes that allow customers to directly credit the businesses' bank accounts.

In 2022, WAAFI won the Changing Lives Award, at the GSMA's GLOMO award ceremony for its role supporting in humanitarian situations.

In 2024, Hormuud's collaborated with WAAFI, Paymentology, Mastercard and Salaam Somali Bank to roll out “Tap and Go” contactless payments in Somalia for the first time. The WAAFI mobile app now allow users to digitally open an account, create a digital Mastercard card, attach the card to a wallet or account, tokenise the card on a digital device, so contactless payments can be conducted with ease.

== Sponsorship ==
In April 2019, the Hormuud Scholarship was launched, giving well-qualified Somali students full ride scholarships to Somali universities. Since 2015, Hormuud has also sponsored a number of regional and national book fairs across the country.

Since 2005, Hormuud has sponsored the Banaadir Regional football league. From 2013, it has also sponsored the annual Somalia Super Cup, the domestic football league final.

== Hormuud Salam Foundation ==
Hormuud Salam Foundation (HSF) is a non-profit foundation that is fully funded by Hormuud Telecom and Salaam Somali Bank, created for the sole purpose of providing charitable contributions to improving the everyday lives of Somalis.

In 2020, during the coronavirus pandemic, HSF and partners donated over US$5 million towards Somalia's coronavirus healthcare and pandemic relief efforts. In 2021, HSF supported the effort to help raise $4 million for the Somalia Action Network COVID-19 relief fund, in partnership with the Somali Chamber of Commerce.

In the same year, the HSF donated Somalia's first public oxygen plant. The plant, purchased from Turkey, was donated to help Somalia cope with severe shortages of medical oxygen. The plant was installed at the Banadir Maternity and Children Hospital, where the foundation has also funded the repair of its COVID-19 ward and the oxygen plant's storeroom.

HSF funds a range of philanthropic relief projects, directly responding to humanitarian crisis across Somalia.

In the winter of 2023, following ‘once in a century’ flooding in the region, Hormuud Salaam Foundation donated and distributed $1million in flood relief. The same year, Hormuud Salaam Foundation sponsored a year of fuel costs for the Banadir Maternity and Children's Hospital in Mogadishu, ensuring the uninterrupted running of services. The foundation also donated ten incubators.

Hormuud Salaam Foundation also sponsored heart disease screening for 119 children in Mogadishu, led by Italian doctors Dr Marianeschi Stefano and Dr Scansani Silvia. As a result of the medial evaluations, 15 children have since been sent to Italy for life-saving surgeries, funded by HSF.

== See also ==
- List of companies of Somalia
