= Somtel =

Somali telecommunications company

Somtel سومتيل
- Type: Mobile network operator.
- Industry: Telecommunications
- Founded: 2009; Hargeisa, Somaliland
- Headquarters: Hargeisa, Somaliland
- Key people: Ahmed Noh Saeed
- Products: Mobile communication
- Owner: Dahabshiil (95%) / Public Shares (5%)
- Website: somtelnetwork.net

Somtel (Somali: Somtel, Arabic: سومتيل) is a telecommunications company headquartered in Hargeisa, Somaliland.

== Regions ==
Somtel provides services in both Somaliland and Somalia.

== Background ==
Somtel provides mobile voice and data services to customers, including Mobile Money Service. It is a 3G and 4G services provider in Somalia's network.

Somtel is largely owned by Dahabshiil but is officially registered in the British Virgin Islands.

== Services ==
- Free charge services
- Subscription services
- Internet service
- Cloud
- Mobile Wallet

== Partnerships ==
=== O3b ===
In November 2013, O3b Networks, Ltd. announced an agreement to provide high-speed, low-latency capacity to Somtel. The pact is expected to improve the firm's networks and reliability.

=== Google ===
Since 2012, Somtel has partnered with Google in e-mail services.

== Frequency Band ==
Somtel operates on GSM and 4G LTE networks. 3G 2100, 2G 1800, 900 and LTE 800MHz 20 FDD.
