= Economy of Somalia =

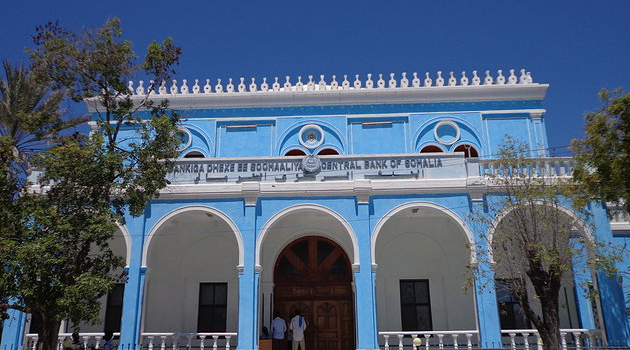
- Currency: Somali shilling (SOS)
- Trade organisations: AU, AfCFTA (signed), CAEU, GAFTA (candidate), CEN-SAD, IGAD
- Country group: Low-income economies

Statistics
- Population: ▲19,655,000 (2025)
- GDP: ▲$14.17 billion (nominal, 2026); ▲$34.11 billion (PPP, 2026)
- GDP growth: 3.7% (2024)
- GDP per capita: ▲$813 (nominal; 2026 est.); ▲$1,940 (PPP; 2026 est.)
- GDP per capita growth: -0.4% (2025)
- GDP by sector: Agriculture: 40.2%; Industry: 27.4%; Services: 32.5%; (2013 est.)
- GDP by component: Household consumption: 32.6%; Government consumption: 38.7%; Investment in fixed capital: 20%; Investment in inventories: 0.8%; Exports of goods and services: 0.3%; Imports of goods and services: −1.6%; (2015 est.)
- Inflation (CPI): 1.5% (2017)
- Population below national poverty line: 63% *est)
- Labour force: ▲3,924,554 (2019)
- Labour force by occupation: Agriculture: 60.2%; Industry: 7.4%; Services: 32.5%*(2013)
- Unemployment: ▲11.4% (2019) (Note: Modeled ILO estimate)
- Main industries: Sugar refining, textiles, livestock, money transfer, telecommunications

External
- Exports: ▲$1.1 billion (2024 est.)
- Export goods: Livestock, bananas, hides, fish, charcoal, scrap metal
- Main export partners: Ethiopia 29.7%; France 16.3%; Kenya 5.2%; UAE 5.1%; Yemen4.1%; (2017)
- Imports: ▲$9.0 billion (2024 est.)
- Import goods: Manufactures, petroleum products, foodstuffs, construction materials, qat
- Main import partners: Ethiopia 17.6%; Sudan 17.2%; Indonesia 6.9%; Russia 5.3%; Turkey 4.1%; (2017)
- Gross external debt: $5.3 billion (31 December 2014 est.)

Public finance
- Government debt: 76.7% of GDP (2017 est.)
- Foreign reserves: 23 Million (2022)
- Budget balance: 0.0% (of GDP) (2018)
- Revenue: $1.0 billion
- Spending: ▲1 billion (2022)
- All values, unless otherwise stated, are in US dollars.

Somalia has a developing economy. It generates $14.17 billion in gross domestic product (GDP) as of 2026. In 1994, the CIA estimated GDP at purchasing power parity (PPP) to be approximately $3.3 billion. According to a 2007 British Chambers of Commerce report, the private sector has experienced growth, particularly the service sector. Unlike the pre-civil war period, when most services and the industrial sector were government-run, there has been substantial, albeit unmeasured, private investment in commercial activities. The investment has been largely financed by the Somali diaspora, and includes trade and marketing, money transfer services, transportation, communications, fishery equipment, airlines, telecommunications, education, health, construction and hotels.

Somalia's economy consists of both traditional and modern production, with a gradual shift to more modern industrial techniques. According to the Central Bank of Somalia, about 80% of the population are nomadic or semi-nomadic pastoralists, who keep goats, sheep, camels and cattle. The nomads also gather resins and gums to supplement their income.

In 2025 Somalia ranked 123rd out of 123 countries that measure hunger. Their global hunger index of 42.6 is a rating that is considered "alarming". It is estimated that close to 6 million people, or one-third of Somalia’s population and 1.9 million children face severe food shortages and/or severe malnutrition.

== History ==
=== Civilian government 1960-1969 ===
During the 1960s, the economy of the Somali Republic was characterized by limited economic development, growing concerns over corruption and public financial management. observers and later historians described the civilian administration as increasingly affected by corruption, alleging that public funds were diverted for political patronage and electoral purposes while foreign aid projects were frequently mismanaged. By some accounts, the administration spent nearly five times the annual agriculture budget on Land Rovers to rig elections, a level of graft compared to New York's 19th-century Tweed Ring and Capone.

One report referred the Somali republic as a "graveyard of aid schemes," and the Los Angeles Times observed that the country remained as impoverished as it had been at independence in 1960. Ozay Mehmet, an economist at the London School of Economics, noted that Somali living standards had declined over the course of the 1960s, leaving the population worse off by 1969 than at independence in 1960.

“Indeed, evidence suggests that living standards, on average, were lower at the close of the decade than at its beginning. It is therefore apt to inquire whether foreign aid to Somalia played any useful role or what sort of contribution it made.”

President Abdirashid Ali Shermarke publicly acknowledged the problem of corruption, attributing the country's recurring drought-related crises in part to the corruption of members of parliament. General Siad Barre, then commander of the SNA, likewise criticized the civilian government's reliance on foreign aid, arguing that it was incompatible with Somalia's objective of achieving economic self-reliance

''We cannot go hat in hand in search of funds because that will be humiliating and contrary to the principle of self-reliance to which the nation is committed. . . . The only sensible solution to the deficit problem is to tighten our belts and cut down on luxuries.''

In 1968, Prime Minister Mohamed Haji Ibrahim Egal stated in an interview with The New York Times that Somalia's inability to respond effectively to the ongoing drought was due to an empty state treasury. Contemporary accounts, however, attributed the depletion of government finances largely to Egal's own use of state funds to secure parliamentary support ahead of the 1969 elections.

Following the 1969 revolution, Egal was accused of embezzling approximately 3 million Somali shillings estimated at around US$26 million in present-day value. and of distributing embezzled government funds to American nationals, including John Bainbridge, who was arrested and expelled from Somalia. At the time of the coup, Egal was in the United States, where it was reported that he had spent state funds gambling at roulette tables in Las Vegas.

=== Siad Barre era ===
Stanford-trained economist Vali Jamal estimated Somalia's GDP per capita at US$406 in 1978 (approximately US$2,000 in present-day terms), arguing that official statistics had substantially underestimated agricultural production. By his estimate, Somalia's per capita GDP exceeded that of several African countries, including Egypt, Ghana, Sudan, Tanzania, and Kenya, as well as most other states in East Africa.

This estimate was reinforced by Somalia's first official national accounts, compiled in 1979 through three independent studies conducted jointly with the Somali Central Statistical Department, two by the UN Economic Commission for Africa and one by the World Bank (IBRD). The IBRD calculated a figure of US$342, a figure that put Somalia well out of the league of the least developed countries entirely. The report further estimated that 17 percent of the population lived below the poverty threshold, describing this as comparatively low by African standards and consistent with the relative absence of urban shanty settlements and widespread visible malnutrition in Somalia at the time.

Barre's economic record was frequently linked to broader assessments of his government's low levels of corruption. Although many scholars of military rule in Africa argued that military regimes were often as corrupt as the civilian administrations they replaced, Somalia under Barre was frequently identified as an exception. One observed that the 1969 coup had brought to power "almost puritanical officers" who sharply reduced corruption, while a 1975 investigative hearing before a U.S. Senate subcommittee likewise identified Somalia as one of the least corrupt countries in Africa. Fiscal discipline contrasted sharply with the preceding civilian administration, where financial mismanagement was reported to be so pervasive that the government was unable to produce a complete fiscal report because of administrative irregularities. Whereas the national budget had recorded continuous deficits since independence, Barre's government achieved Somalia's first budget surplus in 1971, with the surplus subsequently allocated to development projects.

Somalia's socialist government undertook a marked expansion of the state’s capacity to collect revenue, an achievement widely seen as symbolising a break from the administrative weakness of the civilian era. Whereas the previous government had struggled to enforce taxation even in urban centers. The post 1969 government extended tax collection into rural and nomadic bush areas, reaching rural communities in the bush that had largely fallen outside the state’s fiscal reach.This institutional strengthening corresponded in a rise in tax revenue. From 1970 onward, tax revenue doubled by 1975.

=== Economic liberalisation ===
In 1972, the government constructed a commercial complex housing over 100 shops as part of efforts to promote free trade within the country. By 1980, all price controls had been dismantled, and Somalia had completed its transition to a free market economy. In a 1976 speech addressing private investment, Siad Barre stated the following:

"We have no new nationalizations in view. Our goal was, and it remains, to nationalize the firms of those who exploit the Somali people. But we have never had the intention of attacking private property as such Private property has been nationalized only when it constituted an element of exploitation. No one here, for example, has ever thought about nationalizing agriculture or industry. On the contrary, we encourage private enterprise in that area. In any case, there is no question of nationalizing land, because we have enough arable land for everyone who needs any''

The response of the Somali economy to the reform liberalisation was described as impressive. The dramatic increase in grain production following the liberalisation of cereals marketing helped Somalia achieve self-sufficiency in maize and sorghum, while farmer incomes rose in relative terms, measured against the price of grain versus consumer goods. The U.S. Department of Commerce noted that private sector activity “exploded” during this period: new shops opened rapidly across cities and towns, minibus services multiplied, and the number of drugstores grew from around 20 to several hundred within a few years, while consumer goods became more widely available in greater variety and quantity throughout the country.

=== Agriculture ===
In the early 1970s, the CIA issued a special assessment describing the economic challenges facing Somalia's new government as a "Herculean task", citing the country's arid environment, limited natural resources, and largely undeveloped economy, in which most of its 2.8 million inhabitants depended on nomadic pastoralism and subsistence agriculture. The report attributed these difficulties to the civilian government's development programs, characterising them as inefficiently administered and having achieved little beyond giving Somalia a reputation for squandering foreign aid.

Barre made reducing the economic disparity between northern and southern Somalia a central objective of his agricultural policy, alongside programs to combat overgrazing and increase domestic food production. In 1973, government ministers were dispatched to Gabiley to promote improved agricultural practices among local communities. Over the following decade, cereal production increased substantially: sorghum output rose by 87 percent, from an average of 139,000 tonnes in the 1970s to 260,000 tonnes by 1985, while maize production increased by 162 percent, from 107,000 to 280,000 tonnes, making Somalia largely self-sufficient in both crops. A UNICEF report found that absolute poverty and malnutrition in Somalia were lower than in most countries in sub-Saharan Africa and reported no evidence of long-term deterioration in either indicator.

=== Civil war and state failure ===
According to the World Bank, within two years of the outbreak of civil war in 1988, Somali state institutions collapsed and "most of the economic and social infrastructure and assets were destroyed". In 2003, the World Bank reported that despite the absence of a state and its institutions, the Somali private sector experienced impressive growth, but that "most of these sectors are now becoming either stagnant or their growth is hindered due to the lack of investment, trained manpower and the absence of a relevant legal and regulatory framework to enforce rules and regulations, common standards and quality control". The report noted difficulties encouraging and making use of domestic savings for investment, due to the lack of formal financial services and regulatory agencies. The lack of state institutions, the Bank argued, resulted in the prevention of access to international capital markets.

In an article published in 2007, libertarian economist Peter T. Leeson argued that the Somali state was "a predatory state", and that its collapse had improved the economic welfare of its citizens, with 14 out of 18 key development indicators being more positive in the period 2000-2005 than in 1985–1990. Similarly, economists Benjamin Powell, Ryan Ford and Alex Nowrasteh argued that Somalia's economic performance, relative to other African states, has improved during the period of statelessness. Ersun Kurtulus stated that Leeson and Powell, Ford and Nowrasteh's articles provide "the most unequivocal evidence to indicate that Somalia has been faring far better under anarchy than it did under Barre's regime". Kurtulus argued that these authors may provide a valid explanation of the situation in Somalia, but that "the argument appears to be derived from a hypothesis which is rooted in a liberal conceptualisation of statehood rather than in a quantitative analysis which establishes a negative correlation between indicators of state predation and those of economic and social welfare". Kurtulus suggests that the collapse of a repressive state may improve personal and civil liberties, but that such an account "overemphasises endogenous factors that are vested in the domestic arena, while neglecting the exogenous factors that operate at the regional and international level".

== Economic indicators ==
According to the African Development Bank, Somalia is "characterized by a severe lack of basic economic and social statistics". This situation has been exacerbated by the civil war and institutional collapse, although even prior to Somalia's state failure, data was often unreliable.

The World Bank reports that Somalia's GDP was $917.0 million in 1990 and its total population was 13.42 million in 2014, and has since risen to 15 million as of 2018, marking roughly a 12% increase in its total population since then. In 2018 the World bank estimated an annual GDP of $6.2 billion, similar in size to Guam and the Kyrgyz Republic, and classifies it as a low-income country. The United Nations Statistics Division reports a GDP figure of $10.969 billion for 2025, compared to $8.628 billion in 2020 and $6.628 billion in 2015. Previously, it reported $1.559 billion for 2017, compared to $1.071 billion in 2010 and $2.316 billion in 2005.

According to the Central Bank of Somalia, sometime in the 2000s the country's GDP per capita according to the World Bank was $230, a slight reduction in real terms from 1990. The 2012 Human Development Report estimates per capita GDP to be $284, compared with an average across sub-Saharan Africa of $1,300 per capita. This GDP per capita figure is the fourth lowest in the world. About 43% of the population live on less than 1 US dollar a day, with about 24% of those found in urban areas and 54% living in rural areas.

According to the United Nations Development Programme (UNDP) Somalia, as of 2012 the country had some of the lowest development indicators in the world, and a "strikingly low" Human Development Index (HDI) value of 0.285. This would rank amongst the lowest in the world if comparable data were available, and when adjusted for the significant inequality that exists in Somalia, its HDI is even lower. The UNDP notes that "inequalities across different social groups, a major driver of conflict, have been widening".

An International Monetary Fund mission to Somalia reports estimated GDP growth of 3.7% in 2014 and CPI inflation of -71.10%. The report notes that provided that Somalia's security situation continues to improve modestly and there is no drought, economic growth in the medium term should average 5%, but that "growth will remain inadequate to redress poverty and gender disparities". An estimated 73% of the people of Somalia live below the poverty line in 2016.

== Economic sectors ==
=== Agriculture ===
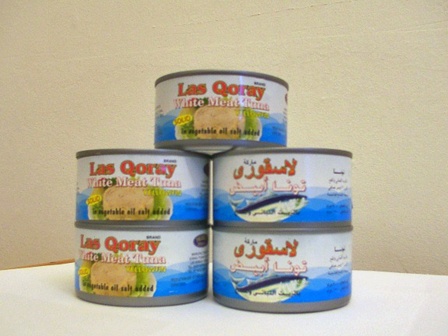
Cans of Las Qoray brand tuna fish made in Las Khorey

Agriculture is the most important economic sector. It accounts for about 65% of the GDP and employs 65% of the workforce. Livestock contributes about 40% to GDP and more than 50% of export earnings. Other principal exports include fish, charcoal and bananas; sugar, sorghum and corn are products for the domestic market. According to the Central Bank of Somalia, imports of goods total about $460 million per year, and have recovered and even surpassed aggregate imports prior to the start of the civil war in 1991. Exports, which total about $270 million annually, have also surpassed pre-war aggregate export levels but still lead to a trade account deficit of about $190 million US dollars per year. However, this trade deficit is far exceeded by remittances sent by Somalis in the diaspora, which have helped sustain the import level.

With the advantage of being located near the Arabian Peninsula, Somali traders have increasingly begun to challenge Australia's traditional dominance over the Persian Gulf Arab livestock and meat market, offering quality animals at very low prices. In response, Persian Gulf Arab states have started to make strategic investments in the region, with Saudi Arabia building livestock export infrastructure and the United Arab Emirates purchasing large farmlands. Additionally, fishing fleets from Europe and Asia have reached commercial fishing agreements in the northern Puntland region.

With Somalia exporting 3 million sheep in 2012, its live exports to the Middle East have overtaken Australian exports which numbered 2 million. According to the Australian Bureau of Agricultural and Resource Economics and Sciences, 99% of the country's livestock exports are headed to the Middle East. However, since 2006, there has been a 10% decline "because of increasing competition in export markets from African and eastern European sheep exports". More than 5 million livestock were exported in 2014, the highest amount in 20 years. Neighbouring Somaliland is also home to some of the largest livestock markets, known in Somali as seylad, in the Horn of Africa, with as many as 10,000 heads of sheep and goats sold daily in the markets of Burao and Yirowe, many of whom shipped to Gulf states via the port of Berbera. The markets handle livestock from all over the Horn of Africa.

Frankincense and myrrh are important export products for Somalia. Along with Ethiopia and Kenya, Somalia is one of the world's three largest suppliers of these products.

=== Fisheries ===
Somalia has the longest coastline in Africa. During the summer monsoon, the Somali region undergoes a significant upwelling phenomenon that enhances plankton productivity, thereby benefiting fisheries. Wind and coastal dynamics initially drive this upwelling, but eventually eddy flows influence it. The Somali upwelling is the 5th largest upwelling globally. Due to it, millions of tons of migratory fish species enter Somali waters each year, making them one of the most profitable fishing grounds in Africa.

Fishing plays an important role in the country's blue economy. A 2015 study found that Somali fishermen earn about $8700 a year in Somaliland, $7900 in Puntland, and around $8400 in the rest of Somalia. Local fishermen's incomes increased by up to 400% from around 2013 to 2018. The monthly average income for boat owners had risen from $264 in 2012 to $1,288 in 2018. Experts estimate that the industry could be worth up to $2 billion annually. By 2024, the value of the domestic fisheries sector remained modest at around $135 million per year.

However, presumptions about underexploited stocks must be viewed with suspicion as under reporting of local landings is quite high. In 2015, most reports of annual landings from Somalia quoted a figure of around 30,000 MT, but a study revealed 110,000 MT of fish was caught annually just in Puntland. Much of the fish caught by local fishermen is sold at-sea and never brought to shore, and is therefore not recorded as caught or landed in Somalia by Somali fishermen, even if data was recorded at local landing sites. Most of these fish are reportedly bought by Yemeni traders.

Somalia loses hundreds of millions to illegal, unreported and unregulated fishing (IUU) annually. A 2005 estimate reported $100 million in losses, while a 2009 estimate reached $450 million. In addition to revenue loss, illegal fishing vessels, mostly trawlers, cause overfishing. The operation of these illegal fishing vessels affect the import and export markets as they prevent legal local catches from being exported. A study on the impact of IUU fishing on Somalia's GDP concluded that eliminating it would increase Somalia's GDP from 4 to 6 percent. Fishermen in Puntland are the most affected by IUU fishing.

=== Manufacturing ===
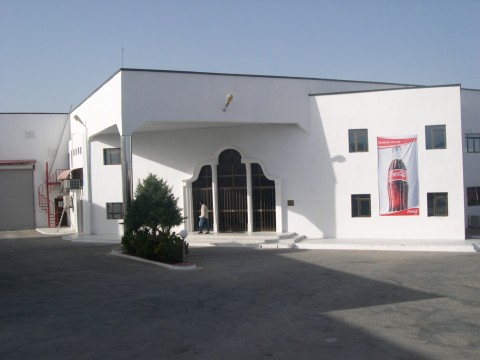
The Coca-Cola bottling plant in Mogadishu

Prior to the outbreak of the civil war in 1991, the roughly 53 state-owned small, medium and large manufacturing firms were struggling, with the ensuing conflict destroying many of the remaining industries. However, primarily as a result of substantial local investment by the Somali diaspora, many of these small-scale plants have re-opened and newer ones have been created.

In 2001, investments in light manufacturing had expanded in Bosaso, Hargeisa and Mogadishu, indicating growing business confidence in the economy. To this end, in 2004, an $8.3 million Coca-Cola bottling plant opened in Mogadishu, with investors hailing from various constituencies in Somalia. Various other sectors have also attracted foreign investment from the likes of General Motors and Dole Fruit.

By 2015, new developments included fish-canning and meat-processing facilities in northern regions, along with around 25 factories in the Mogadishu area producing goods such as pasta, mineral water, plastic bags, textiles, detergents, soap, aluminum products, foam mattresses and pillows, fishing boats, as well as engaging in packaging and stone processing.

In 2018, manufactured goods accounted for 23% of Somalia's exports, while primary commodities made up the remaining 77%. Machinery and transportation equipment comprised 70% of the value of manufactured goods exports from Somalia in 2018, with chemical products accounting for 5% and other manufactured goods 25%. The value of all product exports from Somalia averaged $443million annually from 2009 to 2018.

According to the 2019 Somalia Labour Force Survey, 83% of employment was in the informal sector. In 2022, services accounted for the largest share of employment at 59.9%, followed by industry at 18.0%, and agriculture at 13.5%. The share of jobs in manufacturing was reported as low, at around 12% for established businesses, largely in food processing.

As of 2025, manufacturing in Somalia is overwhelmingly informal. The majority of firms operate in the informal sector, with formal establishments representing only about 28% of all businesses according to the World Bank. Formal firms are overwhelmingly micro-sized and highly concentrated in a few urban centers. Nearly 97% of formal firms employ 1–9 people and are mostly structured as sole proprietorships, which account for 91% of these establishments. Mogadishu hosts 31% of all formal establishments in the country.

In March 2026, the Minister of Commerce and Industry announced that the ministry was developing a comprehensive policy to boost domestic production and reduce Somalia's reliance on imports. The plan aims to increase value-added processing of local resources, particularly in the livestock sector. The minister also noted that Somalia could strengthen its export capacity and benefit from wider regional markets, including the East African Community.

=== Civil aviation ===
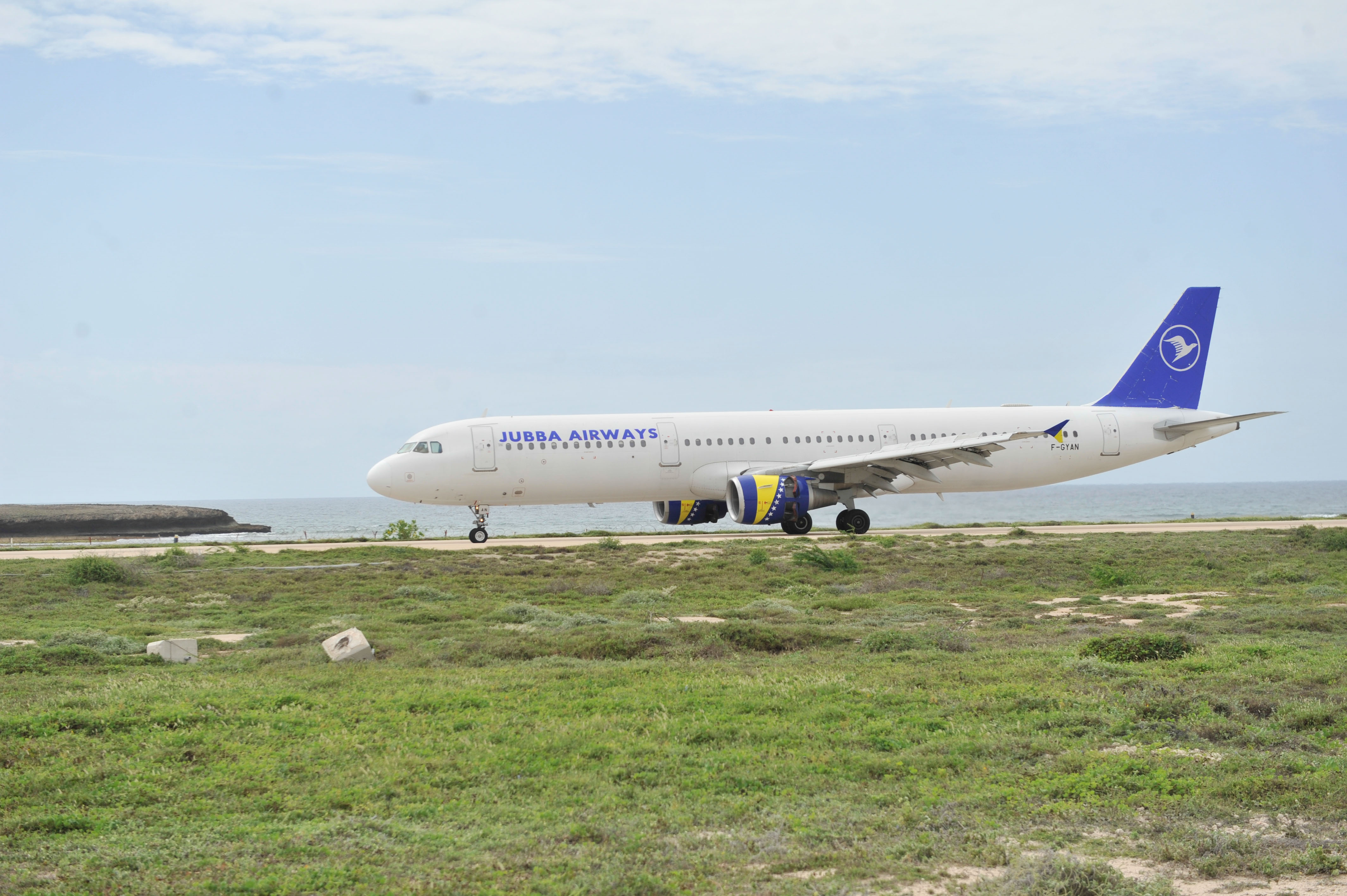
Jubba Airways plane taking off in Mogadishu

Following the start of the civil war, all of Somali Airlines operations were officially suspended in 1991.

In 2001, the Somali Air Operators Association (SAOA) was founded as a representative body for airline operators in Somalia. By 2014, there were over six Somali-owned private carriers filling the gap. These included Daallo Airlines, Jubba Airways, African Express Airways, East Africa 540, Central Air and Hajara. Daallo and Jubba merged as the African Airways Alliance in 2015.

In the mid-2010s the Somali government began rebuilding its aviation institutions with support from ICAO and the International Air Transport Association (IATA). This process culminated in 2017, when ICAO officially handed control back to the Somali government, and by 2018 the Somali Civil Aviation Authority (SCAA) began actively managing the Mogadishu FIR from a modernized Air Traffic Control (ATC) center at Aden Adde International Airport in Mogadishu. By 2023, Somalia had fully restored air traffic control services and upgraded its airspace to Class A for the first time in since 1991, the change to Class A airspace has the potential to increase traffic to as many as 600 flights a day.

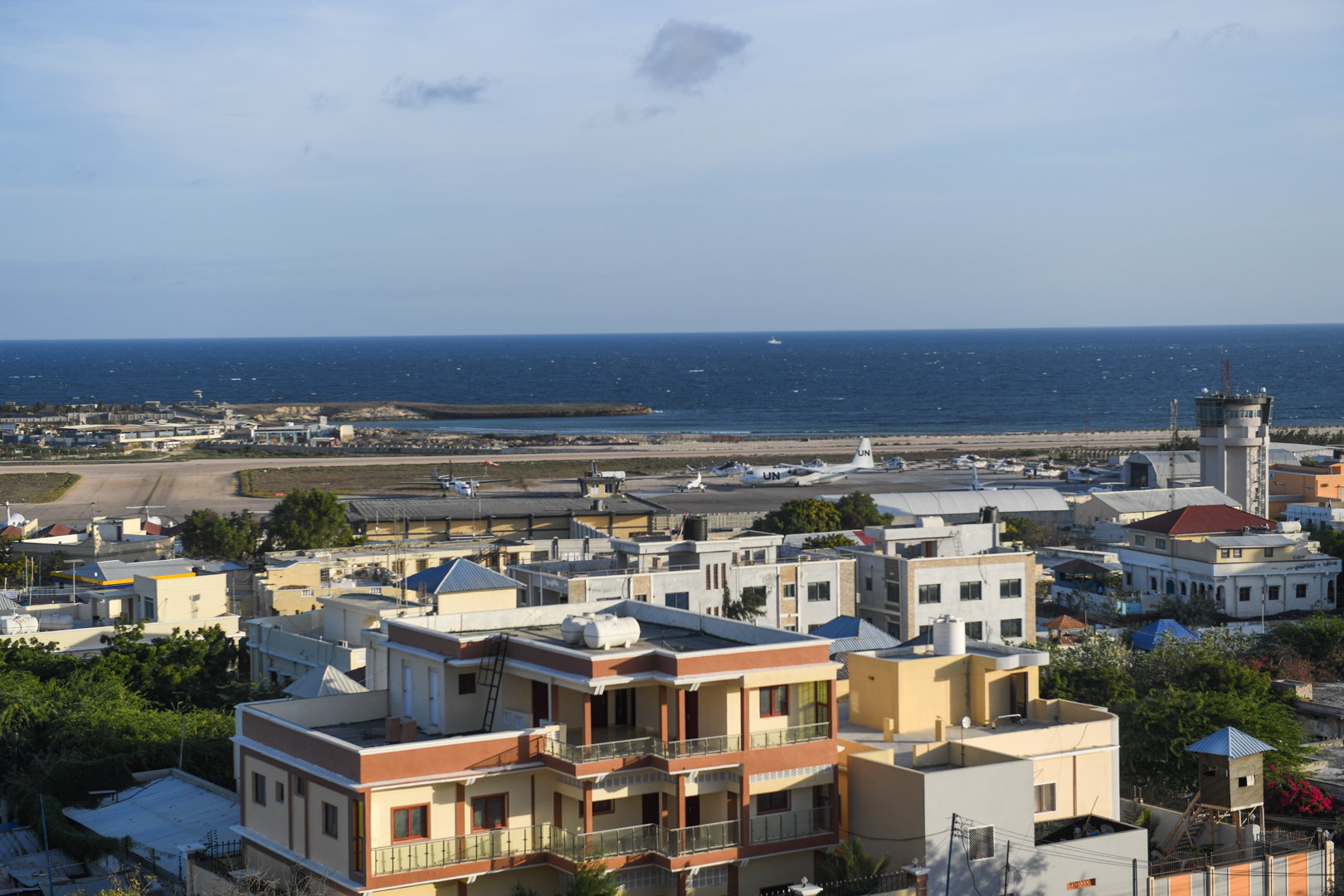
A view of Aden Abdulle International airport in Mogadishu

In 2024, a new international airport project near Mogadishu was announced to expand aviation capacity and support future growth, with construction beginning in 2025. With an initial investment of $714 million, the phase 1 of the New Mogadishu International Airport is predicted to be completed by 2029. The new airport will feature two 4,000m runways, a dedicated cargo terminal with 100,000 tons of annual cargo capacity, and 5 million passengers a year capacity with future plans to increase to 10 travelers annually.

In July 2025, the Somali Minister of Transport and Civil Aviation, Mohamed Farah Nuh, announced that the federal government plans to relaunch Somali Airlines, the country's national carrier that had been inactive since 1991. The Minister had announced that the government had signed a deal to acquire two Airbus a320 jets. In December 2025, it was announced that the airline was in its final stages of operational planning, the Federal Government had completed several major steps, including forming a management board, establishing a regulatory framework, securing international partnerships and purchasing new aircraft. Mohamed Farah had also said that four additional international airlines were preparing to enter the Somali market, joining the eight already flying to Mogadishu, including Turkish Airlines.

In February 2026 a new regional airline was launched in Mogadishu named Hilaac Air. As of 2026, the airline operates one Saab 340 and another Beechcraft 1900 connecting Hargeisa, Garowe and Mogadishu weekly. Another regional airline was launched in the same month, Rayaan air took its first delivery of a Fokker 50 at Mogadishu's Aden Adde in February 2026. Omani low‑cost carrier SalamAir also launched the first direct route between Mogadishu and Muscat in February 2026.

=== Construction ===
Prior to 1991, Somalia's construction sector was largely state-led, with the socialist government financing the development of public buildings, industrial facilities, and key infrastructure such as roads, ports, and agricultural schemes, most often with foreign assistance. The collapse of the central government in 1991 brought formal construction activity to a halt.

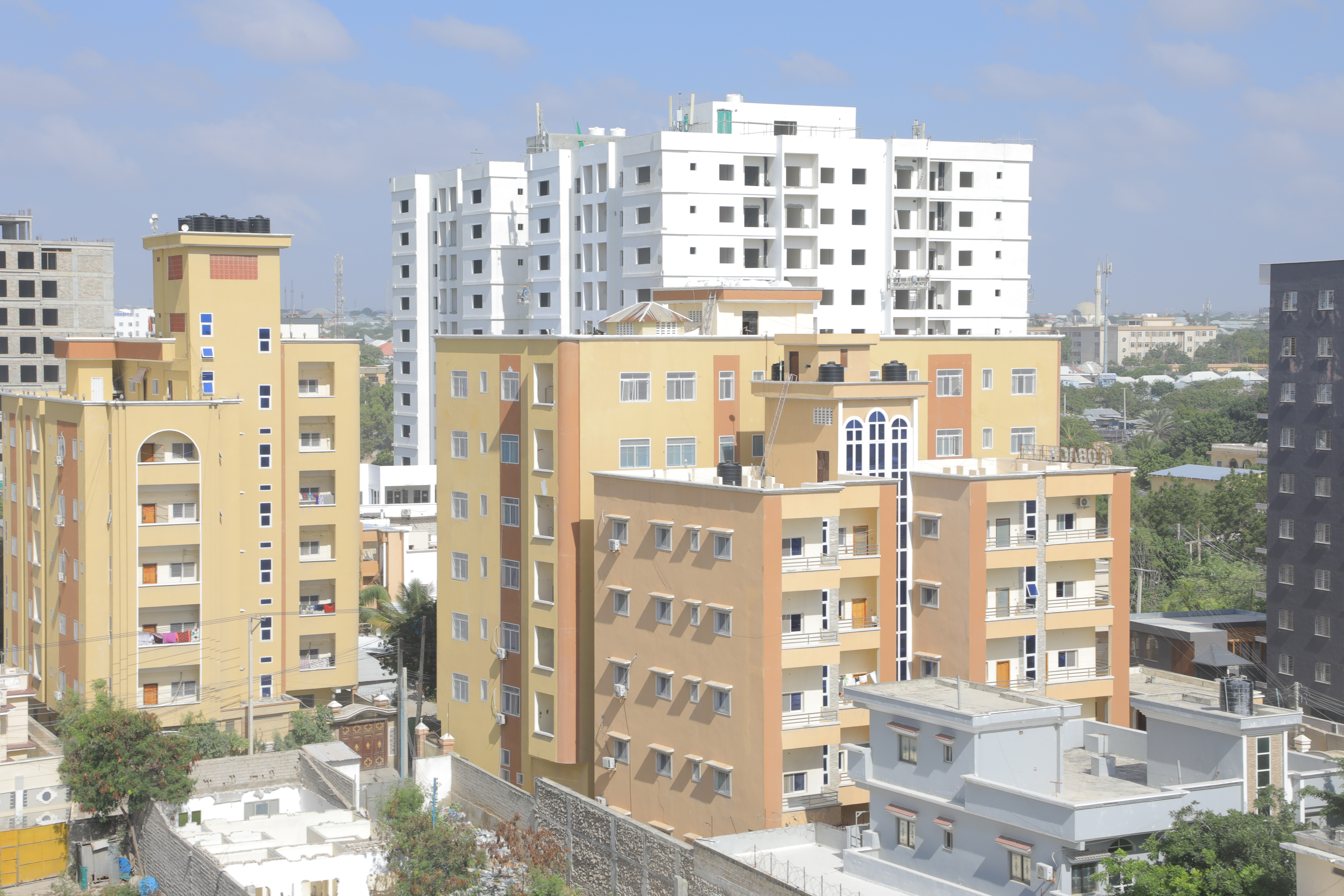
Newly completed apartments in Mogadishu

The establishment of the Federal Government of Somalia in 2012, as well as the 2011 al-Shabaab withdrawal of Mogadishu, marked a turning point in the country's recovery, coinciding with a significantly improved security environment compared to the previous decades. By 2012, reconstruction was already underway in Mogadishu, with residents rebuilding damaged properties and land prices rising as confidence slowly returned. United Nations reports from 2012 noted that in Mogadishu, the sound of conflict was being replaced by construction activity and commercial growth. With the return of many residents to Somalia, demand for air travel increased, requiring advance bookings, and a number of new hotels were established to accommodate travelers. The sudden expansion of the real estate sector led to frequent shortages of construction materials, particularly concrete. In November 2012, Turkey offered to build a new construction yard producing concrete, paving stones and asphalt to alleviate the shortages, 50 construction machines and trucks from Turkey were also brought to Mogadishu. Observers were already referring to a "Mogadishu boom" as returning residents and improving security led to new construction projects and increased urban activity.

As a result of improved security conditions in Mogadishu, the Economist Intelligence Unit reported in 2015 that construction of new infrastructure and repairs to previously abandoned homes was still occurring in the city. The post-conflict reconstruction of Mogadishu in the 2010s and 2020s has led to a construction and housing boom, giving Somalia one of the fastest urbanisation rates in the world with cement blocks piled up in many streets of the capital.

In 2024, construction began on the Somalia Business Bay (SBB) Mall in Mogadishu's Hamarweyne district, planned as the country's largest shopping centre and expected to generate over 2,000 jobs once completed. Plans for the Mogadishu Rotana, a five‑star hotel with 321 guest rooms and serviced apartments, were also unveiled in 2024 as part of a broader redevelopment of the capital's hospitality and commercial sectors. The Gateway Complex project, launched in 2024, is also planned to include a five‑star hotel, international conference centre, a shopping mall, hospital, school, and luxury residences, representing one of Mogadishu's most ambitious developments in decades. Construction of Dahab Tower, planned to become Mogadishu's tallest building and a major mixed‑use development, has been underway since the early 2020s as part of the city's rapid post‑2012 reconstruction and urban growth. Other major projects are being built by the Hargeisa based Rio Architects firm, such as the Barakaat mall, Traffico mall, Ambassador hotel, Buruuj complex, the new Mogadishu airport and others.

According to the office of the mayor of Mogadishu, over 6,000 new buildings were constructed in the city between 2020 and 2025. There have also been government-led efforts to rehabilitate and build roads in the capital as part of post‑conflict reconstruction and economic infrastructure improvement. However, the Central Intelligence Agency's World Factbook states that development has not spread to other parts of Somalia due to the ongoing war. Al‑Shabaab's control of large rural areas has hindered commerce, investment, and sustainable development.

In November 2025, President Hassan Sheikh inaugurated the modern Banadir Steel Factory In Mogadishu, a major factory producing construction-grade reinforcement steel using recycled metal.

Hargeisa, the capital city of Somaliland, has also experienced rapid urban expansion and infrastructure development in recent years as its population has grown and economic activity increased.

=== Finance ===
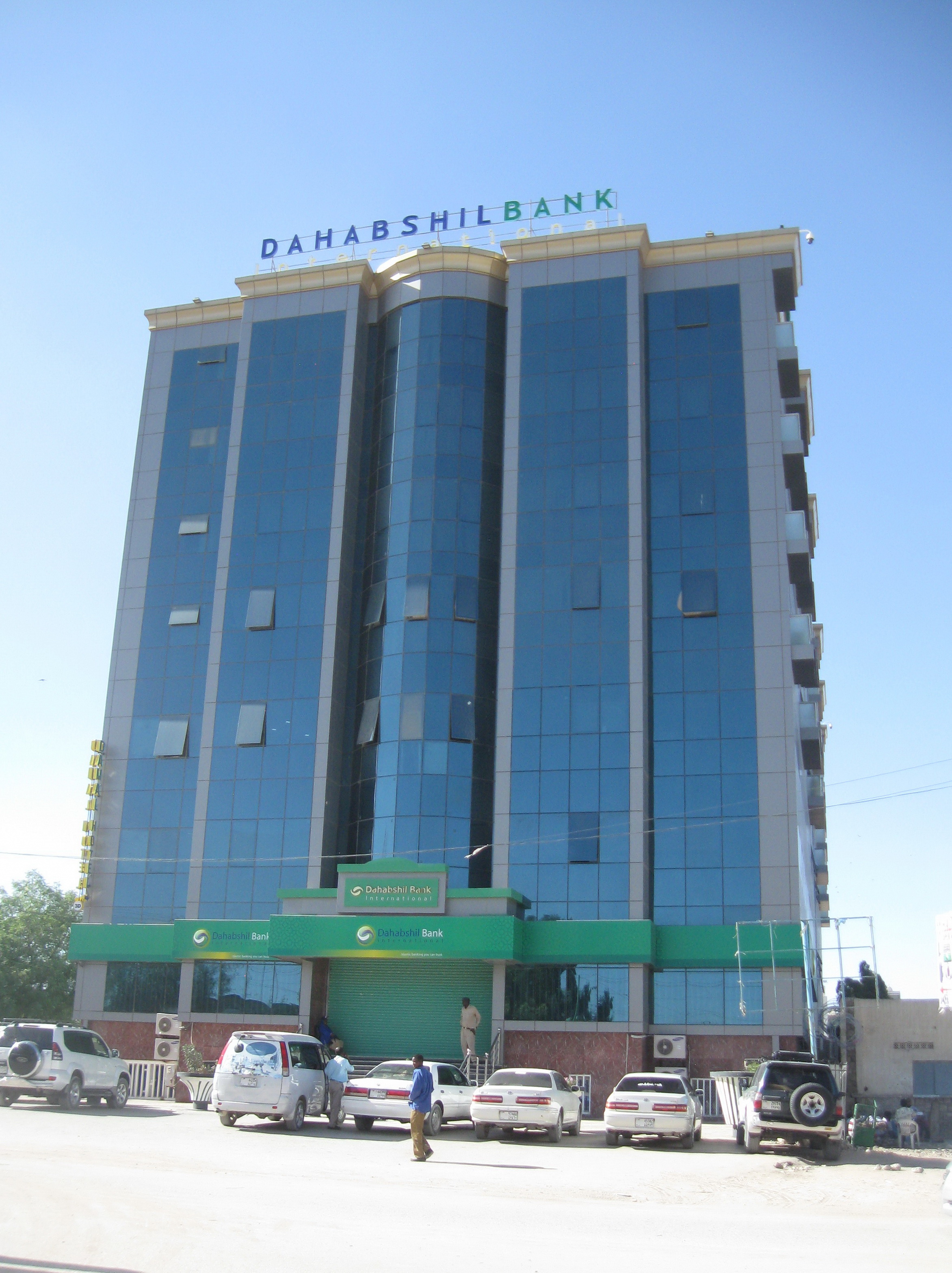
A Dahabshiil bank branch in Hargeisa

The Central Bank of Somalia is the official monetary authority of Somalia. In terms of financial management, it is in the process of assuming the task of both formulating and implementing monetary policy. In 2013 the African Development Bank assessed that the Somali Central Bank was "handicapped by the lack of adequate human, material and financial resources", but that it would be able to reduce the rate of inflation once it assumed control of monetary policy and issued a new currency. At this time Somaliland also had a central bank, though its main roles were to serve as a treasury to the government and print currency.

Owing to a lack of confidence in the local currency, the US dollar is widely accepted as a medium of exchange alongside the Somali shilling. Dollarization notwithstanding, the large issuance of the Somali shilling has caused inflation. The central bank says it will end the inflationary environment when it assumes full control of monetary policy and replaces the presently circulating currency introduced by the private sector.

Somalia has had no central monetary authority for upwards of 15 years between the outbreak of the civil war in 1991 and the subsequent re-establishment of the Central Bank of Somalia in 2009. Bank-to-bank transfers are not possible, which led to the rise of private money transfer operators (MTO) that have acted as informal banking networks.

These remittance firms (hawalas) have become a large industry in Somalia, with an estimated US$1.6 billion annually remitted to the region by Somalis in the diaspora via money transfer companies. The latter include Dahabshiil, Qaran Express, Mustaqbal, Amal Express, Kaah Express, Hodan Global, Olympic, Amana Express, Iftin Express and Tawakal Express. Most are credentialed members of the Somali Money Transfer Association (SOMTA), an umbrella organization that regulates the community's money transfer sector, or its predecessor, the Somali Financial Services Association (SFSA). Somalia is the world's fourth-most country dependent on remittances. Most remittances are sent by Somalis-based abroad to relatives in Somalia. This accounts for 20%-50% of the Somali economy.

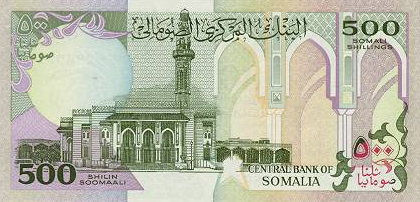
A 500 Somali shilling banknote

Dahabshiil is the largest of the Somali money transfer operators (MTO), having captured most of the market vacated by Al-Barakaat. The firm has its headquarters in London and employs more than 2000 people across 144 countries, with 130 branches in the United Kingdom alone, a further 130 branches in Somalia, and 400 branches globally, including one in Dubai. The company provides a broad range of financial services to international organisations, as well as to both large and small businesses and private individuals. After Dahabshiil, Qaran Express is the largest Somali-owned funds transfer company. The firm has its headquarters in both London and Dubai, with 175 agents worldwide, 66 agents in Somalia and 64 in London, and charges nothing for remitting charity funds. Mustaqbal is the third most prominent Somali MTO, with 8 agents in Somalia and 49 in the UK. As with Dahabshiil and Qaran Express, it also has a notable presence internationally.

As the reconstituted Central Bank of Somalia fully assumes its monetary policy responsibilities, some of the existing money transfer companies are expected in the near future to seek licenses so as to develop into full-fledged commercial banks. This will serve to expand the national payments system to include formal cheques, which in turn is expected to reinforce the efficacy of the use of monetary policy in domestic macroeconomic management.

With a significant improvement in local security, Somali expatriates began returning to the country for investment opportunities. Coupled with modest foreign investment, the inflow of funds have helped the Somali shilling increase considerably in value. By March 2014, the currency had appreciated by almost 60% against the U.S. dollar over the previous 12 months. The Somali shilling was the strongest among the 175 global currencies traded by Bloomberg, rising close to 50 percentage points higher than the next most robust global currency over the same period.

=== Stock exchange ===
Somalia did not possess a formal stock exchange prior to the collapse of the state in 1991. During the late 2000s, reports described an informal "pirate stock exchange" in Harardhere, where individuals could invest cash, weapons, or other resources into piracy operations in exchange for a share of ransom proceeds.

The Somalia Stock Exchange (SSE) , became the first formal bourse in the country founded in 2011 by the Somali diplomat Idd Mohamed and operational since 2015. The SSE was established to attract investment from both Somali-owned firms and global companies in order to accelerate the ongoing post-conflict reconstruction process in Somalia. In August 2012, the SSE signed a Memorandum of understanding with the Nairobi Securities Exchange (NSE) to assist it in technical development. The agreement includes identifying appropriate expertise and support. Sharia compliant sukuk bonds and halal equities are also envisioned as part of the deal as Somalia's nascent stock market develops.

Initially, seven Somali-owned firms from the financial services, telecommunications and transportation sectors were expected to list their shares for prospective global investment. The SSE has 9 listed as of 2026. Despite its groundbreaking role, the Somali Stock Exchange was established as a private initiative by the Somali Economic Forum rather than as a state-run institution. With transactions often facilitated through intermediaries in the absence of fully developed electronic trading systems, the SSE has been described as operating informally compared to modern regulated exchanges.

In 2024, the Somali Stock Exchange participated in global financial awareness campaigns such as the "Ring the Bell for Gender Equality" initiative. In 2025, the Somali Stock Exchange joined the East African Securities Exchanges Association, linking Somalia's capital market with regional exchanges. In June 2025, the Somali Stock Exchange launched the inaugural Somali Capital Markets Forum in Mogadishu, bringing together government officials, investors, and financial institutions to support the development of the country's capital markets. The SSE has also expanded into Islamic finance, co-hosting the East Africa Islamic Finance Forum in 2025 alongside the Nairobi Securities Exchange to promote Sharia-compliant investment products such as sukuk.

The National Securities Exchange of Somalia (NSES) was officially launched in Mogadishu on 19 June 2025 as the country's first state-supported stock exchange. Trading is expected to commence in 2026, initially focusing on equities and Sharia-compliant sukuk, with priority sectors including telecommunications, banking, real estate, and energy. The NSES aims to attract domestic and diaspora investment, support capital formation, and integrate Somalia into regional and global financial markets. The initiative is supported by the Ministry of Finance and the Central Bank of Somalia to integrate the country into regional and global financial markets. The exchange officials are targeting listings from at least 10 firms in the next 2 years, Yasin Ibar, who previously served as CEO of the Somali Bankers Association has been appointed CEO.

=== Mineral industry ===
Somalia holds significant oil and natural gas reserves, both onshore and offshore. Geo-seismic studies have shown that Somalia has at least 30 billion barrels of oil reserves. A 2017 study revealed that Somalia is home to 20,582.75 kilometres of untapped reserves. Seismic surveys conducted by Spectrum Geo reveal total offshore deposits could be as high as 100 billion barrels. Onshore reserves are also significant and mostly concentrated in the northern part of the country. (Note: In the Nugaal and Dharoor basins of Puntland.)

Somalia is currently pursuing the development of its hydrocarbon resources through licensing rounds and production-sharing agreements with international energy companies. Following the adoption of the Petroleum Law in 2020, the government opened offshore blocks to foreign investors and established the Somali Petroleum Authority to regulate the sector. Since then, multiple agreements have been signed, including deals with Coastline Exploration and Liberty Petroleum for several deep-water blocks, with exploration phases focused on seismic surveys and eventual drilling. In addition, Turkey's state oil company has been granted both offshore and onshore blocks, conducting 3D seismic surveys and preparing for exploratory drilling, while Somalia aims to drill its first wells in the coming years.

Most of the country's mineral wealth is located in the Sanaag mountains which is controlled by Puntland and Somaliland but also claimed by the newly established Northeast State administration. In March 2026, the federal government hosted a meeting between U.S. investors and Somali government officials to discuss opportunities in Somalia's natural resources sector. On 13 March 2026, Somalia's Ministry of Petroleum and Mineral Resources had signed a Memorandum of Understanding (MoU) with the U.S. State of West Virginia to explore, extract, and process these mineral resources.

In April 2026, Somali President Hasan Sheikh Mohamud declared that Somalia's natural resources could be worth billions, if not trillions of dollars.

=== Telecommunications and media ===
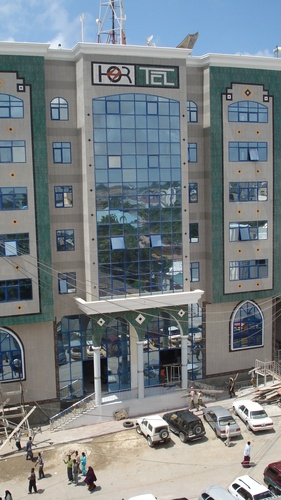
The Hormuud Telecom building in Mogadishu

Somalia's telecommunications system was destroyed during the fighting which took place in 1991. By 2010 various new telecommunications companies were providing this missing infrastructure. Funded by Somali entrepreneurs and backed by expertise from People's Republic of China, Japan, EU and Korea. These nascent telecommunications firms offer affordable mobile phone and internet services that are not available in many other parts of the continent. Customers can conduct money transfers and other banking activities via mobile phones, as well as easily gain wireless internet access. However, the operations of the companies were constrained by the continuing fighting.

In 2004, installation time for a landline was three days, while in Kenya to the south, waiting lists were many years long. Interviewed in 2004, telecommunications firms were "desperate" to have an effective government: "everything starts with security." There are presently around 25 mainlines per 1,000 persons, and the local availability of telephone lines (tele-density) is higher than in neighboring countries; three times greater than in adjacent Ethiopia. Prominent Somali telecommunications companies include Golis Telecom Group, Hormuud Telecom, Somafone, Nationlink, Netco, Telcom and Somali Telecom Group. Hormuud Telecom alone grosses about $40 million a year. To dampen competitive pressures, three of these companies signed an interconnectivity deal in 2005 that allows them to set prices and expand their networks.

A 2010 report stated that the expansion of Somalia's telecom industry provided one of the clearest signs that the country's economy was growing.

As of 2015, there were also 20 privately owned Somali newspapers, 10 radio and television stations, and numerous internet sites offering information to the public.

=== Energy ===
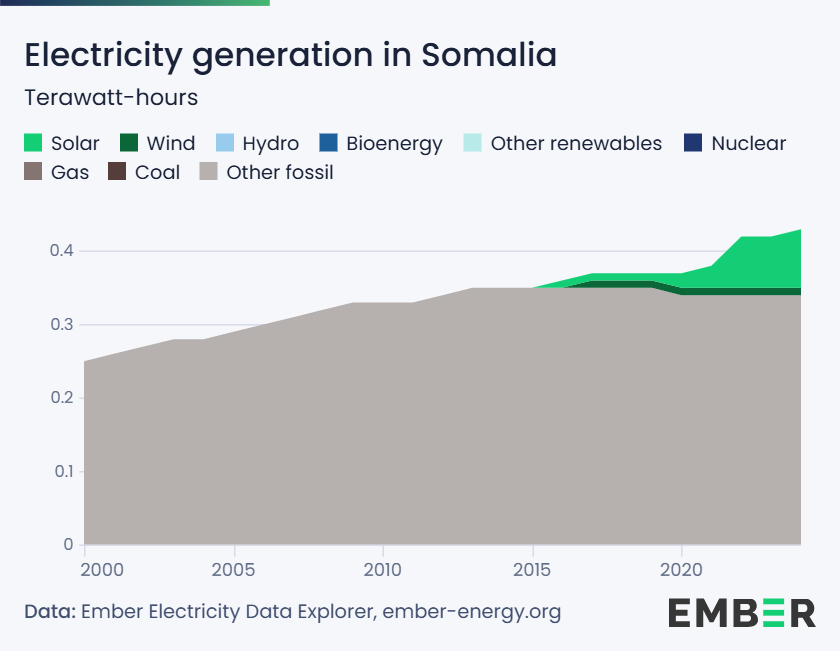
Electricity generation in Somalia in terawatt-hours

Somalia's late 20th-century energy supply relied on biomass fuels and imported petroleum. Electricity generation, nationalized in 1970, was produced by small oil-fired and diesel plants dependent on imported fuel, with limited expansion in the 1980s. A 10,000 bpd refinery built near Barawa in the late 1970s faced disruptions during the Iran–Iraq War, leading to renewed reliance on refined imports, though it was operational again by 1989. War and looting devastated power plants and state utilities.

After the fall of the central government, electricity in Somalia became heavily decentralized. Since 1991, About 55 private electricity providers supply more than 90% of the power in the country. These private firms operate off-grid systems and typically manage their own generation, transmission, and distribution without national coordination. Electricity generation in Somalia is overwhelmingly diesel-based, with around 90% of power produced from expensive diesel generators. In 2023, the average cost of electricity in Somalia was about $0.61 per kilowatt-hour. Prices exceeded $1 per kilowatt-hour in some areas.

In 2012, only 15% of the population had access to electricity. In urban areas 33% had access, compared to 4% in rural areas. By 2024, electricity access had risen to around 61.9% overall, with 80.1% in urban areas and 39.4% in rural areas, driven mainly by privately operated diesel mini-grids. The Somali government plans to raise the overall figure to 80% by 2029 by expanding electricity access to more rural areas. As of 2026, Somalia has no domestic oil production, and all petroleum products (diesel, gasoline, kerosene, LPG) are imported through private traders and regional suppliers. Petroleum therefore plays a vital role in transport, electricity generation, and urban energy supply.

==== Renewable energy ====
Since 1991, Somalia's renewable energy sector has developed largely through private initiatives. In Somaliland, a 5 MW solar plant was commissioned in the city of Berbera in 2026. In Puntland, Somalia's first hybrid solar-wind plant began operating in 2016 in the city of Garowe. The largest solar power plant in Somalia was built by the private company BECO in Mogadishu in 2020, with a capacity of 10 MW, supplying electricity to the city. BECO has also announced plans to expand the plant's capacity to 100 MW. In addition, several other companies in Mogadishu provide off-grid solar energy solutions, including Blue Sky, Solargen, Delta, and others.

Studies suggest Somalia has high potential for onshore wind power. Somalia also has excellent solar energy potential due to its location near the equator and consistently high sunlight levels. Despite this strong potential, solar energy remains underutilized, with only limited installed capacity and gradual adoption in hybrid systems and mini-grids. Only about 10% of the electricity used in Somalia comes from renewable sources.

== Maritime trade ==
Exports of Somalia by product category (2019) Chemical products Transportation Machines Mineral products Plastics and rubbers Metals Foodstuffs Precious metals Textiles Instruments Animal products Vegetable products Paper goods Footwear and headwear Miscellaneous Stone and glass Wood products Animal and vegetable bi-products Animal hides Arts and antiques Weapons

Somalia's coastline of over 3300 km gives the country significant potential for maritime trade and port development along major global shipping routes. The development of strategic corridors and ports could help to leverage Somalia's proximity to major maritime routes and enhance trade in sectors such as agriculture.

Under national infrastructure plans, key road corridors expected to be developed by 2029 will connect coastal ports such as Hobyo, Mogadishu, Garacad, and Kismayo to the rest of the country as well as the Kenyan and Ethiopian borders. New ports are also being built at Barawa and Mogadishu. In February 2025, the South West State administration signed a $500 million agreement with Kuwaiti firm Arabic Holding to develop and operate the Port of Barawa granting the company a 25‑year concession to expand the port's capacity and build infrastructure. A new port is also being built just north of the city of Mogadishu named the New Mogadishu Maritime Port (NMMP), with an initial investment of $850 million and scheduled for completion by 2028, it is expected to become the largest port in the Horn of Africa. Berbera Port in Somaliland has also undergone substantial upgrades, including a new container terminal that increases capacity to around 500,000 TEUs per year, and plans for a second phase of expansion to boost capacity to about 2 million TEUs annually.

Projections suggest that Somalia could earn roughly $1.9 billion annually from Ethiopian trade through the Port of Berbera alone, while revenues from the Port of Mogadishu could reach about $2.5 billion per year based on current traffic ratios. Additional revenues have also been projected for other Somali ports, including Berbera's oil terminal, Kismayo, and Bosaso. Combined with potential transit trade from Kenya and other East African markets, total government revenues from Somali seaports have been estimated at up to $8 billion annually if port infrastructure, trade agreements and logistics networks are fully developed.

The country currently has 5 operational ports at Berbera, Bosaso, Garacad, Hobyo, Mogadishu and Kismayo. As of 2026, the biggest port in Somalia is Berbera, followed by the current Mogadishu port.

== Data ==
The following table shows the main economic indicators in 1960–2022.

Year	GDP (in billion US$ nominal)	GDP per capita (in US$ Nominal)	GDP (in billion US$ PPP)	GDP per capita (in US$ PPP)	GDP growth (real)
1960	0.2	63	...	...	...
1970	0.3	87	...	...	...
1980	0.6	102	...	...	...
1990	0.9	131	...	...	...
2013	5.8	454	13.5	1,052	...
2014	6.5	491	16.3	1,222	7.5%
2015	7.0	508	19.6	1,422	9.9%
2016	7.4	517	21.5	1,506	6.4%
2017	8.4	555	23.2	1,558	9.5%
2018	8.3	537	24.4	1,585	3.0%
2019	9.2	590	25.8	1,613	3.6%
2020	9.2	557	25.4	1,538	−2.6%
2021	9.8	577	27.5	1,609	3.3%
2022	10.4	592	30.1	1,711	2.4%

The following table shows the main economic indicators in 2011–2026. Inflation above 5% is in green.

Year	GDP (in bil. US$ PPP)	GDP per capita (in US$ PPP)	GDP (in bil. US$ nominal)	GDP growth (real)	Inflation (%)
2011	19.0	n/a	5.0	n/a	n/a
2012	▲19.6	▲1653	▲5.2	▲1.2	n/a
2013	▲21.0	▲1728	▲5.9	▲5.7	▲2.8
2014	▲22.0	▲1757	▲6.4	▲2.7	▲1.3
2015	▲23.2	▲1804	▲6.8	▲4.6	▲0.9
2016	▼23.1	▼1749	▲7.4	▼ -1.3	▲0
2017	▲25.8	▲1896	▲8.3	▲9.5	▲4
2018	▼24.0	▼1715	▼7.9	▲1.4	▲4.3
2019	▲24.8	▲1727	▲8.7	▲2.8	▲4.7
2020	▼24.2	▼1639	▼8.6	▼ -2.8	▲4.1
2021	▼24.1	▼1583	▲9.5	▲3.5	▲4.6
2022	▲26.5	▲1695	▲10.2	▲2.7	▲6.8
2023	▲28.6	▲1782	▲11.0	▲4.2	▲6.2
2024	▲30.5	▲1849	▲12.2	▲4.1	▲5.5
2025	▲32.3	▲1905	▲13.0	▲3	▲3.7
2026	▲34.1	▲1956	▲14.2	▲2.6	▲5.9

== See also ==
- Transport in Somalia
- Oil exploration in Puntland
- United Nations Economic Commission for Africa

== Bibliography ==
- Mauri, Arnaldo, Banking Development in Somalia, SSRN 958442 (1971).
