= Mineral industry of Somalia =

The Natural resources of Somalia refers to the country's minerals, fossil fuels, renewable energy sources, and other materials found naturally within its territory. In April 2026, Somali President Hasan Sheikh Mohamud declared that Somalia's natural resources could be worth billions, if not trillions of dollars.

== Oil and Gas ==
Somalia holds significant Oil and Natural gas reserves, both onshore and offshore. Geo-seismic studies have shown that Somalia has at least 30 billion barrels of oil reserves. A 2017 study revealed that Somalia is home to 20,582.75 kilometres of untapped reserves. Seismic surveys conducted by Spectrum Geo reveal total offshore deposits could be as high as 100 billion barrels. Onshore reserves are also significant and mostly concentrated in the northern part of the country. (Note: In the Nugaal and Dharoor basins of Puntland.)

International Oil companies (IOCs) have shown interest in Somalia's Oil and Gas since the 1950s. The first oil rush in Somalia, from the 1940s to the 1960s, began when Sinclair Oil Corporation and Agip started exploration in 1945. The first well (Sagaleh-1) was drilled in 1956, sparking a rush of major oil companies to the country. In 1961, oil flowed at the Coriole-1 well onshore near Qoryoley, with around 700 barrels of oil gushing out. The oil was paraffinic and light with an API of 44-47. This oil boom was abruptly halted after the military takeover in 1969, when Somalia became a Soviet-aligned state, leading Western companies to leave.

After the Ogaden war in 1977, The Somali Government had re-opened ties with the West and had made drilling concessions and licenses of several onshore wells along the entire length of the eastern basin (almost half of Somalia's land area) to international companies in the 1980s. Following successes within the Yemeni Jurassic basins during the 1980s, a great deal of renewed interest was shown in the country. Exploration was abruptly halted due to the outbreak of the Somali civil war in 1991. Since then, IOCs have been paying rental fees on the blocks to the current governments until exploration resumed.

In February 2020, the Federal Government of Somalia ratified the Somali Petroleun Law, this law established the legal framework for petroleum exploration and production in Somalia. It clarified that petroleum resources are the property of the Somali people and outlined the governance structure for the industry. In July 2020, the Somali Petroleum Authority was established, the SPA is responsible for regulating the petroleum sector, including issuing exploration licenses, reviewing production sharing agreements, and ensuring compliance with national laws. In August 2020, Somalia launched its first-ever offshore licensing round, offering several offshore blocks for bidding. This initiative aimed to attract international investment

=== Coastline Exploration Deal ===
In 2022, Houston based Coastline Exploration Ltd had bought seven off-shore blocks from the Federal Government of Somalia; CEO Richard Anderson told S&P Global :

"I think the potential is there for multiple tens of billions of barrels, recoverable, or even more over time.. Just the areas we are looking at would be in that range, in the upside case, and that is just in our blocks."

Coastline Exploration has invested over $50 million in Somalia, including a $7 million signature bonus for each block. In October 2022, after five amendments to an earlier agreement rejected by the Farmaajo administration, a deal was signed in Istanbul granting Somalia a 50-50 profit share, a 30% income tax, and a 5% royalty. In March 2023, Coastline Exploration has partnered with Actus Veritas Geosciences (AVGEO) to prepare a geological assessment of offshore Somalia. The study confirmed the existence of multiple petroleum plays with clastic and carbonate reservoirs in water depths between 1500 and 3200m. Coastline estimates that discoveries in these plays would have the potential to deliver up to 100,000 barrels of oil per day when developed. Richard Anderson, Coastline Exploration's CEO, declared :

"We are pleased with the study results and are looking for partners to develop the blocks. We are ready to open the data room for interested parties to attend."

In November 2023, geoscientists at Coastline Exploration reported that the Somali Basin system showed strong potential for major hydrocarbon development, estimating a 50-70% likelihood of viable oil-generating source rocks, suggesting that multiple trillions of barrels of oil equivalent may have been generated over geological time. They concluded that long-standing concerns about the existence of a working petroleum system offshore Somalia are largely unfounded, with the region exhibiting the key characteristics of a prolific, multi-billion-barrel petroleum province.

=== Liberty Petroleum deal ===
In March 2024, US based Liberty Petroleum signed three PSAs covering offshore Blocks 131, 190, and 206, granting them a five-year exploration period.The agreement permits Liberty to conduct evaluations and 3D seismic surveys to determine drilling viability. If these surveys are successful, they may lead to comprehensive oil extraction operations. The deal followed more than a decade of negotiations, beginning with the first production sharing contracts signed in 2013. The company claimed at least 8 billion barrels could be found in their blocks.

In January 2026, Liberty Petroleum announced it had identified exploration prospects across two of its offshore Somali blocks that could contain around 15 billion barrels of oil in place. By March 2026, Liberty Petroleum stated that it expected to complete the agreed Year 2 3D seismic acquisition programme across its three Somali PSAs within the planned Q1 2025 to March 2026 window, with field and navigation data to be delivered to the Somali Petroleum Authority and final acquisition and QC reports to follow within six months of demobilisation. In March 2027, Liberty is expected to include full processing of the acquired 3D seismic across its blocks, and an integrated seismic interpretation to produce a ranked catalogue of leads and drill-ready opportunities across the main petroleum systems. By 2028, one exploration well is planned to be drilled in each block, with well completion reports to be issued within six months of drilling, followed by a final evaluation to decide whether to enter the second term of the licences.

=== Turkish deal ===
In March 2024, Turkey signed an energy cooperation agreement with Somalia, granting the Turkish Petroleum Corporation (TPAO) rights to explore three offshore blocks and conduct full-cycle activities, including development and production. Under the 2024 oil deal, TPAO could recover up to 90% of production as cost petroleum. This recovery phase was said to be temporary, after which the remaining profits would be shared, with Somalia receiving 70% of the profits in addition to a 5% royalty from the start of production.

The agreement drew controversy over the scale of the cost recovery terms. According to Radio Dalsan reporter Abdirazak Ali Gesey, much of the controversy centers around a misinterpreted provision that allows the operator (TPAO) to recover up to 90% of annual production value; he argues that the Nordic Monitor, a platform run by exiled Turkish opposition journalists have misinterpreted this as Turkey receiving 90% of Somalia's oil revenue. Ismail Osman, Former Deputy Director of NISA, has described the deal as one of the most strategic and forward-looking oil agreements in Africa's modern energy history, comparing it to Nigeria's 55% and Ghana's 58%, and emphasizing that the recovery cost is only temporary. Additionally, in October 2024, Turkey's state-owned energy company, TPAO, and Somalia's Petroleum Authority signed a separate agreement for future onshore hydrocarbon exploration.

Turkey's seismic research vessel, Oruc Reis, was dispatched to Somalia on October 5, 2024, by Turkish President Recep Tayyip Erdogan, as part of the agreement between the TPAO and Somalia's Ministry of Petroleum and Mineral Resources. The ship came back in June 2025 after a 234-day mission collecting seismic data over 4,464 square kilometres in three offshore blocks in Somali waters. An estimated 20 billion barrels of commercially viable oil reserves were discovered in two of the three blocks. The Somali Minister of Petroleum and Mineral Resources had also stated that exploration was problematic due to the amount of illegal fishing vessels nets interfering with the exploration equipment.

In April 2026, the deep-sea drilling vessel Cagri Bey arrived in Somali waters to begin offshore drilling operations. The vessel was deployed to drill the Curad-1 well, located roughly 370 km offshore, with planned depths of up to 7,500 meters, making it one of the deepest offshore drilling projects globally. The operation follows earlier seismic surveys conducted by the Oruc Reis and marks the transition from exploration to active drilling, with campaigns expected to last several months and assess commercially viable hydrocarbon reserves.

=== Northern Somalia ===
In 1989, Conoco had discovered significant oil reserves in the Sool and Sanaag regions but was forced to leave the region due to rising tensions. According to petroleum geologists, the South Arabian Marib-Shabwa and Sayun-Masila basins are associated with the Nugaal and Dharoor blocks in northern Somalia. A hydrocarbon analysis undertaken by the World Bank and the United Nations Development Programme (UNDP) in 1991 confirmed such favourable assessments. It concluded that of all countries bordering the Red Sea and the Gulf of Aden, Somalia had the best future hydrocarbon prospects in the region, second only to Sudan. The Nugaal and Dharoor basins in Northern Somalia are estimated to hold 20 billion barrels of oil.

Studies indicate Somaliland has hydrocarbon potential in Jurassic to Miocene formations, including the Berbera (Bihendula) Basin, conjugate of the Arabian Balhaf Graben Basin. In August 2012, Genel Energy received an exploration license covering onshore blocks SL-10B, SL-13, and the Oodweyne area. Early surface seep studies completed by 2015 estimated ~1 billion barrels of prospective oil in each block. In December 2021, Genel Energy signed a farm-out deal with OPIC Somaliland Corporation, backed by Taiwan's CPC Corporation, on the SL10B/13 block near Aynaba. According to Genel, the block could contain more than 5 billion barrels of prospective resources.

In June 2025, Genel Energy reported that it had completed geotechnical surveys for the SL10B/13 block, located near Aynaba, and was preparing for civil engineering work. However, due to heightened security concerns in eastern Somaliland, the company has suspended operations in that region. Genel is seeking a two-year extension to its contract, which would push the drilling timeline to 2027.

=== Natural gas ===
The country also holds an estimated 200 billion cubic feet of proven natural gas reserves but as of yet no active hydrocarbon production. In 1961, the Afgoye-1 well onshore flowed gas, and the enclosure had an estimated 200Bcf of gas in proven reserves. The total recoverable reserves are estimated to be around 10Tcf onshore. The Federal Government of Somalia have expressed plans to extract natural gas and build a gas power plant in Afgoye as part of the National Transformation Plan 2029.

== Mineral deposits ==
Most of the country's mineral wealth is located in the Sanaag mountains, which are controlled by Puntland and Somaliland but also claimed by the newly established Northeast State administration. In March 2026, the Federal government hosted a meeting between U.S. investors and Somali government officials to discuss opportunities in Somalia's natural resources sector. On 13 March 2026, Somalia's Ministry of Petroleum and Mineral Resources had signed a Memorandum of Understanding (MoU) with the U.S. State of West Virginia to explore, extract, and process these mineral resources. However, three days later the government of the semi-autonomous state of Puntland rejected the deal, citing their concerns over their exclusion from the discussions despite the agreement's direct implications for their local resources. Although the new North-East state in Sool claims the Sanaag region, Puntland controls the area.

In March 2023, Euromark Group and Resonance Ltd, conducting exploration on behalf of the Ministry of Energy and Minerals of Puntland, reported a major mineral discovery in the Sanaag region. Their findings are listed below:

Gold	Tin	Lithium	Copper	Platinum	Titanium	Uranium
567 m/t	6,471,000 m/t	12,000,000 m/t	28,000,000 m/t	2,100 m/t	12,000 m/t	Available but not estimated

=== Gold ===
Most of the country's gold deposits are located in Sanaag.

The recent discovery of gold deposits in the Sanaag region has sparked a growing gold rush. In the village of Milxo, where the deposits were found, nearly 5000 new families have moved to the area in search of gold. Turning the once sleepy village into a bustling small town of commercial activity. Gold mining is done through surface panning by women and children who collect gold from the ground, and deep pit mining by unskilled miners who extract and refine gold ore using basic tools. The mines are highly unsafe and unregulated, with accidents occurring frequently. In October 2022, a man was trapped in a collapsed mine for over 30 hours.

In November 2019, gold was discovered in the Erigavo district of Sanaag, Somaliland, where two clans clashed over deposits unearthed by floods. A year later, in September 2020, Somaliland authorities intervened, introducing regulations and issuing licenses for gold mining. In September 2024, Puntland's government officially legalized gold mining and urged locals to invest in it. In July 2025, Puntland's government with Dubai's DP World invited international companies to bid for gold and copper exploration rights in Sanaag as part of their push for mineral development. In August 2025, Somaliland's Minister of Energy and Minerals officially inaugurated the largest gold mining plant in the Horn of Africa. The facility is located in the Cirshiida area near Erigavo and is run by a local company.

=== Lithium ===
Most of the lithium deposits in Somalia are still in early exploration; there is credible evidence that Somalia has lithium reserves, but as of yet there are no widely published figures for the whole country. Geological surveys show lithium-bearing pegmatites (rocks that often host lithium) in northern Somalia, parts of central Somalia, and in Somaliland. In June 2024, the Saudi mining company Kilomass had secured a license to explore for lithium in Somaliland.

=== Uranium ===
Somalia's uranium ore deposits have been public knowledge since at least the late 1960s. Although small in global terms, Somalia's main uranium reserves are substantial, unsecured and close enough to the surface for strip mining. The main uranium deposits are located in the Galmudug state in central Somalia, near the city of Dhusamareb. Somalia has an estimated 10,200 tonnes of uranium reserves, with 7,600 tonnes of it potentially commercially recoverable, though at relatively high expense. The Alio Ghelle uranium ore deposit in South West State is also unsecured but scattered, relatively far underground and of low grade. Uranium could also be extracted from the unsecured Hamar betafite deposit in western Somaliland but it is too small scale and low quality.

== Wind and Solar ==
Studies suggest Somalia has high potential for onshore and offshore wind power. Wind resource appears suitable for power production in 85% of the country. Somalia has one of the highest combined wind power and solar energy potentials on the planet.

Somalia is believed to have the highest renewable potential in Africa with an average of 3,000 hours of sunlight per year, and one of the highest rates of irradiation in Africa (200 kW/m2). Wind speeds are nearly 20 miles per hour on average, which makes Somalia the location of Africa's highest potential for wind energy, particularly along its coastline. Estimated generation potential in only 4 km2 could produce as much as the entire diesel and hybrid generation presently operating in the country.

The World Bank estimates Somalia could generate up to 283 GW offshore.

== Hydroenergy ==
The Baardheere Dam was a proposed 75 m high multipurpose dam on the Juba River, located about 35 km upstream of Baardheere in the Gedo region. It was estimated to generate 493 MW of hydroelectric power, more than the country's current electricity generation capacity. It was proposed in the late 70s, but the project was halted due to the outbreak of the Somali civil war.

== Fisheries ==
Somalia has the longest coastline in Africa. During the summer monsoon, the Somali region undergoes a significant upwelling phenomenon that enhances plankton productivity, thereby benefiting fisheries. Wind and coastal dynamics initially drive this upwelling, but eventually eddy flows influence it. The Somali upwelling is the 5th largest upwelling globally, due to this phenomenon, millions of tons of migratory fish species enter Somali waters each year, making them one of the most profitable fishing grounds in Africa.

A 2015 study found that Somali fishermen earn about $8700 a year in Somaliland, $7900 in Puntland, and around $8400 in the rest of Somalia. Local fishermen's incomes increased by up to 400% from around 2013 to 2018. The monthly average income for boat owners had risen from $264 in 2012 to $1,288 in 2018. Experts estimate that the industry could be worth up to $2 billion annually. By 2024 the value of the domestic fisheries sector remained modest at around $135 million per year. However, this number may not be accurate as most locally caught fish is not recorded, nor is fish sold at sea; presumptions about underexploited stocks must be viewed with suspicion.

Somalia loses hundreds of millions to illegal unreported and unregulated (IUU) fishing annually. A 2005 estimate reported $100 million in losses, while a 2009 estimate reached $450 million. In addition to revenue loss, illegal fishing vessels, mostly trawlers, cause overfishing, reducing fish stocks, affecting local catches, and harming the marine environment. The operation of these illegal fishing vessels affects the import and export markets as they stop legal local catches from being exported, a study on the impact of IUU fishing on Somalia's GDP concluded that eliminating it would increase Somalia's GDP from 4 to 6 percent. Fishermen in Puntland are the most affected by IUU fishing.

== Challenges ==
Although Somalia has significant natural resource potential, its development is hindered by fragile governance, political instability, and weak institutions. The situation is further exacerbated by the enduring threat of terrorism from Al-Shabaab, which destabilizes regions and deters investment.

== See also ==
- Oil exploration in Puntland
- Economy of Somalia
