= National Securities Exchange of Somalia =

Stock exchange in Somalia

- Type: Stock exchange
- Location: Mogadishu, Somalia
- Founded: 2025
- Key people: Yasin M. Ibar, (CEO)
- Currency: SOS & USD
- Website: www.nses.so

The National Securities Exchange of Somalia (NSES) is the first national stock exchange in Somalia and was officially established in Mogadishu on June 19, 2025. The NSES will initially focus on equities and Sharia-compliant sukuk, particularly in the telecommunications, banking, real estate, and energy sectors. The initiative is supported by the Ministry of Finance and the Central Bank of Somalia to integrate the country into regional and global financial markets.

== History ==
Before the NSES was launched in June 2025 as an official, state-supported stock exchange, there was already the Somali Stock Exchange (SSE), founded by a private company, the Somali Economic Forum, which began trading in 2015 and operated formally. The establishment of the NSES is being promoted by the Somali Ministry of Finance and the Central Bank in order to improve the country's economic situation and become part of the economic momentum in East Africa.

Yasin M. Ibar has been appointed as the first CEO. He was previously CEO of the Somali Banking Association.

== Memberships ==
She is one of nine members of the East African Securities Exchanges Association.

== See also ==
- Somali Stock Exchange
- Economy of Somalia
