= Idd Mohamed =

Somali diplomat

Idd Mohamed (Somali: Ciid Maxamed, Arabic: عيد محمد) is a Somali diplomat. As of August 2012, he served as Somalia's Ambassador extraordinary and deputy permanent representative to the United Nations. He also founded the Somalia Stock Exchange Investment Corporation (SSE) the same year.
