= Garacad =

Town in Mudug, Somalia

- Town
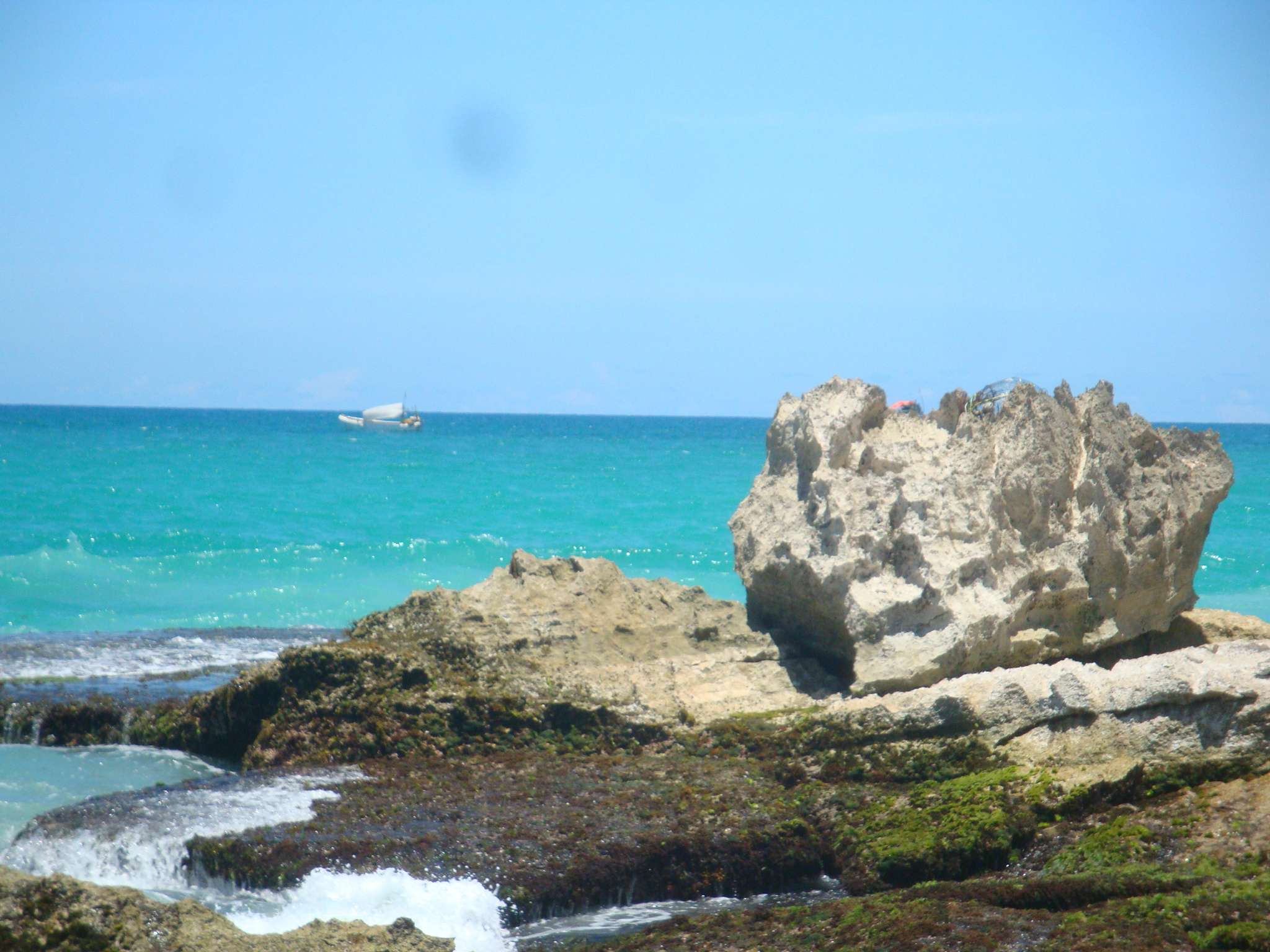
- The Garacad horizon

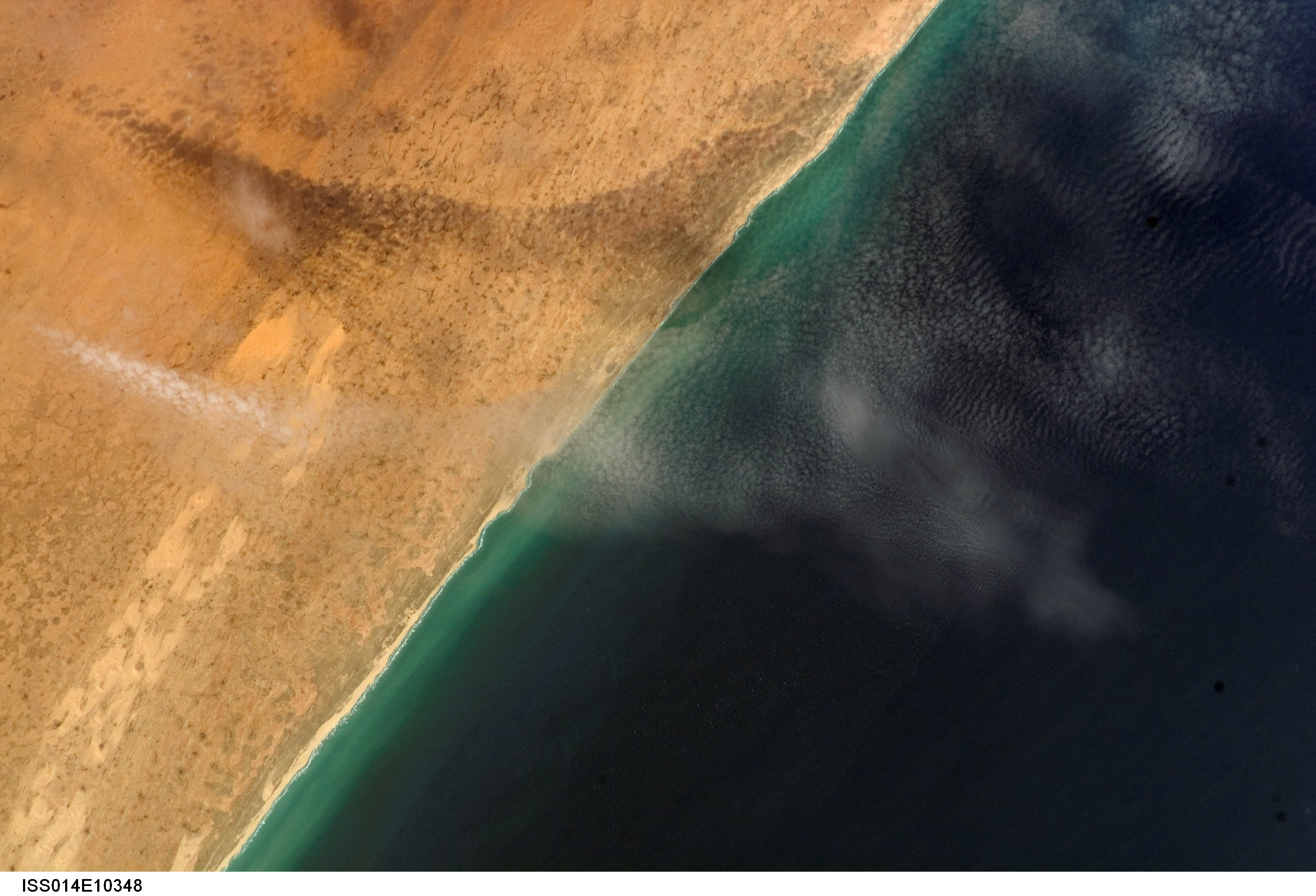

- Location in Somalia.
- Coordinates: 6°56′34″N 49°19′30″E
- Country: Somalia
- Regional State: Puntland
- Region: Mudug
- Time zone: UTC+3 (EAT)
- Postal code: +252

Garacad, also known as Gara'ad, is a historic coastal town in the north east central Mudug region of Puntland, an autonomous state of Somalia. There is currently work to build a new port in the harbour of Garacad.

== See also ==
- Gara'ad port
