= Global shipping network =

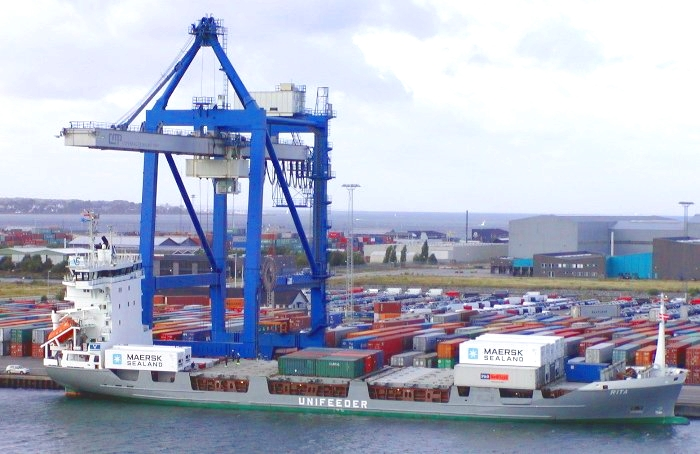
Container ship: loading

The global shipping network is the worldwide network of maritime traffic. From a network science perspective ports represent nodes and routes represent lines. Transportation networks have a crucial role in today's economy, more precisely, maritime traffic is one of the most important drivers of global trade.

== History ==
90% of world trade is transported on water and in 2012, the most heavily trafficked sea route saw ships travel predominantly from China to the West Coast of the United States.

== The network science perspective ==
As with every network, maritime traffic can be also viewed through a network scientist's glass. Ports can be regarded as nodes and the paths ferries travelling on are the lines. If this network is just as any other like railway or airport networks, one can have valid statements about its operation. The ocean's traffic system also has its routes, gateways, some of which functioning as a major hub or interconnection.

A paper by Kaluza et al. investigates cargo ship movements on real data. They use data on all major ports and the largest ships, that can be regarded as the majority of the shipping transport – it contains 93% of the total world capacity of cargo ship transport. Here, "each trajectory can be interpreted as a small directed network where the nodes are ports linked together if the ship travelled directly between ports". The weights of the links between i and j ports are the potential space of the ships travelling between them.

=== Asymmetry ===
The global directed ship network's prominent characteristics is that it is asymmetric – as 59% of the linked pairs have only one direction. The routes are short – there is no need for a lot of steps to get from one port to another, as the average path length is 2.5, with maximum of 8 and 52% of the pairs can be connected by two steps. This is much more fewer than in the case of airport networks as both the average and the maximum are significantly higher: 4.4 and 15 respectively. (Guimera et al.)

=== Clusters ===
The shipping network is highly clustered, its clustering coefficient is 0.49, which can be interpreted that any given node's neighbors are also connected to each other. The average number of links of a node is 76.5, which is much higher as opposed to the airport network, that is 19.4. These facts show that shipping networks are denser, which also gives a higher robustness to it. As many real-world networks it also has the property of having a lot of nodes with only a few links but some having extremely lot of links. Although it is not exactly a scale-free network, the distribution of link weights follows a power law. The distribution of the nodes strength (average link weights arriving and departing from port i) also follows a power law, which means that only a few ports manage immense amounts of cargo.

=== Betweenness centrality ===
Betweenness centrality is another important concept. It is basically the sum of the directed paths in the network that pass through a particular node. Ports with high betweenness are quite important. Such nodes are the Panama and Suez canals or Shanghai and Antwerp.

=== Different subnetworks ===
There are also differences between the main ship types: container ships, bulk dry carriers and oil tankers. These differences reflect to the fact that they follow distinctive traffic patterns. While container ships typically follow set schedules with fixed path for a regular service, dry carriers change their routes more often. Furthermore, container ships are much faster than the other categories - average days spent in the port is 1.9 in contrast to 5.6 of bulk dry carriers or 4.6 of oil tankers. The proper kind of ports also affect the properties of the possible network.
