= Dharoor Valley =

Valley in northeastern Somalia

- Length: 170 miles (270 km)

Geography
- Coordinates: 10°17′35.9″N 49°29′36.3″E
- Interactive map of Dharoor Valley

The Dharoor Valley (Somali: Dooxada Dharoor) is valley located in the Bari province of the autonomous Puntland region in northeastern Somalia. It possesses relatively abundant grazing terrain for pastoralism, similar to the Noobir. Along with the Nugaal Valley, the Dharoor Valley has been a center for oil exploration in Puntland.

== See also ==
- Nugaal Valley
