= Oil exploration in Puntland =

Oil exploration in Puntland began in the mid-2000s as a series of negotiations between the provincial administration and foreign oil companies. By 2012, the Shabeel-1 well encountered oil shows and hydrocarbon-bearing sands, indicating a working petroleum system, but no commercial flow was established. Another well named Shabeel North-1 was drilled shortly after and also did not yield commercial hydrocarbons, leading to abandonment of the well. Puntland is an autonomous region in northeastern Somalia which is a federal state.

== Overview ==
Somalia has untapped reserves of numerous natural resources, including uranium, iron ore, tin, gypsum, bauxite, copper, salt and natural gas.

The Puntland region in northeastern Somalia came to be regarded as a geological analogue of Yemen, as the two areas formed a single landmass until around 18 million years ago, before the rifting of the Gulf of Aden separated the Horn of Africa from the Arabian Peninsula. The oil reserves discovered in Yemen's Cretaceous and Jurassic formations were therefore also thought to potentially exist in Puntland, with petroleum geologists associating the Nugaal and Dharoor blocks with the South Yemen Marib-Shabwa and Sayun-Masila basins, respectively.

== History ==
=== 2005 Puntland-Range Resources Agreement ===
In the 2000s, the Puntland government began official negotiations with foreign oil companies over exploration rights in the area. In October 2005, the regional authorities granted Range Resources a majority stake in two large onshore mineral and hydrocarbon exploration licenses, along with offshore rights. The Nugaal and Dharoor Valley blocks in question span over 14,424 km² and 24,908 km², respectively. Two years later, Range Resources obtained a 100% interest in both blocks and subsequently farmed out 80% of that share to Canmex Minerals.

In 2005, when the licenses were officially awarded to Range Resources, the Puntland government administered the entire Nugaal Valley including the Sool region. However in 2007, Somaliland took control of the region. On account of the uncertain security situation in the Nugaal region, Range Resources had given priority to drilling in the Dharoor Valley since then.

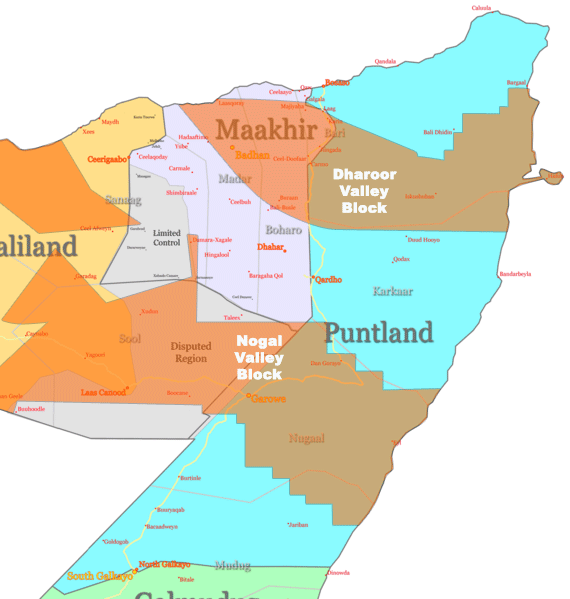
The Dharoor and Nugaal basins.

=== Product Sharing Agreement ===
In January 2007, the Puntland administration, which was then led by President Mohamud Muse Hersi, signed a Product Sharing Agreement (PSA) with Range Resources Limited and the Canmex Minerals subsidiary Canmex Holdings (Bermuda) II Limited.

Under the terms of the both royalty-based and profit sharing agreement, Canmex would commit to two three-year periods of comprehensive oil exploration in the Nugaal and Dharoor Valley blocks. A 20-year period of exploitation would come into effect in the event of commercial oil yields, with an option to extend the duration an additional 5 years. Gross income would be allocated toward royalty payments, production costs and net profits. The royalty payments for produced crude oil would be deducted first and would be periodically issued to the Puntland government by the oil firms according to the table below.

Production versus royalty
Production (barrel oil per day)	Production (m^{3} oil per day)	Royalty
0 to 25,000	0 to 4,000	4.0%
25,000 to 50,000	4,000 to 7,900	5.0%
50,000 to 75,000	7,900 to 11,900	7.0%
75,000 to 100,000	11,900 to 15,900	9.0%
100,000 and over	15,900 and over	10.0%

After these deductions, up to 70% of gross income would be earmarked for unrecovered capital, operating capital and operating expenses. The remaining gross income would be set aside for profit sharing, with 50% going to the Puntland government and 50% to the oil firms. Any future taxes levied on the petroleum activities would also be paid by the Puntland administration through its share of the oil profits.

Following a change in leadership in 2009, the Puntland government, now led by President Abdirahman Mohamud Farole, sought to renegotiate the profit sharing agreement with Range Resources to ensure more favorable terms for the region.

In 2012, the Puntland government gave the green light to the first official oil exploration project in Puntland. Led by the Canadian oil company Africa Oil (the former Canmex Minerals) and its partner Range Resources. Initial drilling at the Shabeel-1 well on Puntland’s Dharoor Block in March of the year encountered oil shows, but did not result in commercial production. A second well, Shabeel North-1, drilled later in 2012, did not find commercial hydrocarbons and was plugged and abandoned. Following these results, companies shifted focus to further seismic work and additional exploration planning rather than production, as no commercial discovery was confirmed.
