= Somali Stock Exchange =

Stock exchange in Somalia

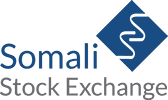
- Type: Stock exchange
- Location: Mogadishu, Somalia
- Founded: Registered in 24 March 2011, Started its Operations 1 September 2015
- Key people: Hassan Dudde, (CEO)
- Currency: SOS & USD
- No. of listings: 10
- Indices: SSE All Shares and OIC COMCEC 50 Shares
- Website: www.sse.so

The Somali Stock Exchange (SSE), also known as the Somalia Stock Exchange, is the national bourse of Somalia founded by SEF.

== Overview ==
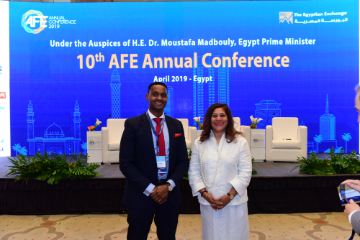
All smiles Hassan Dudde CEO, Somali Stock Exchange and Nandini Sukumar, CEO, World Federation of Exchanges (WFE) meeting at the 10thArab Federation of Exchange in April 2019 in Cairo, Egypt

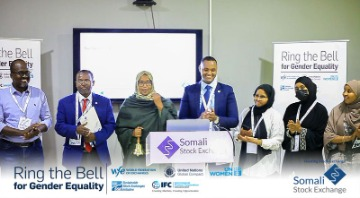
Somali Stock Exchange hosts its first Ring the Bell for Gender Equality event in March 2022

The Somali Stock Exchange (SSE) was founded by the management of the Somali Economic Forum (SEF), whose principal aim is to encourage Foreign Direct Investment (FDI) into Somalia’s growing economy. The company has already made history by becoming the first ever stock exchange to operate inside of Somalia, with the first shares sold on 1 September 2015 at the exchange’s offices in Garowe, Mogadishu and Hargeisa.

Historically, shares in Somali businesses have been bought and sold informally through close networks. However, economists have noted that in recent years, the emergence of various stock exchanges in African states has played a pivotal role in fostering economic and private sector growth. The substantial demand for capital is increasing by the day for Somali businesses, consisting of both large firms and SME’s. According to the latest figures, the capital inflow to Somalia is increasing and it is being driven by both the Somali diaspora and foreigners.

The SSE has created a new capital market, where buyers of financial securities can do business with sellers in a more organised, formal, secure and profitable way. The aim was to create a sustainable capital market in Somalia, where holders of financial securities such as stocks, bonds and buyers or investors can meet and share in long-term growth.

== Products and services ==
Stock, Bonds (Sukuk), Commodities

== See also ==
- List of African stock exchanges
- Central Bank of Somalia
- Ministry of Natural Resources (Somalia)
- Ministry of Industry and Trade (Somalia)
- Ministry of Finance (Somalia)
- Federal Government of Somalia
